= Memorbuch =

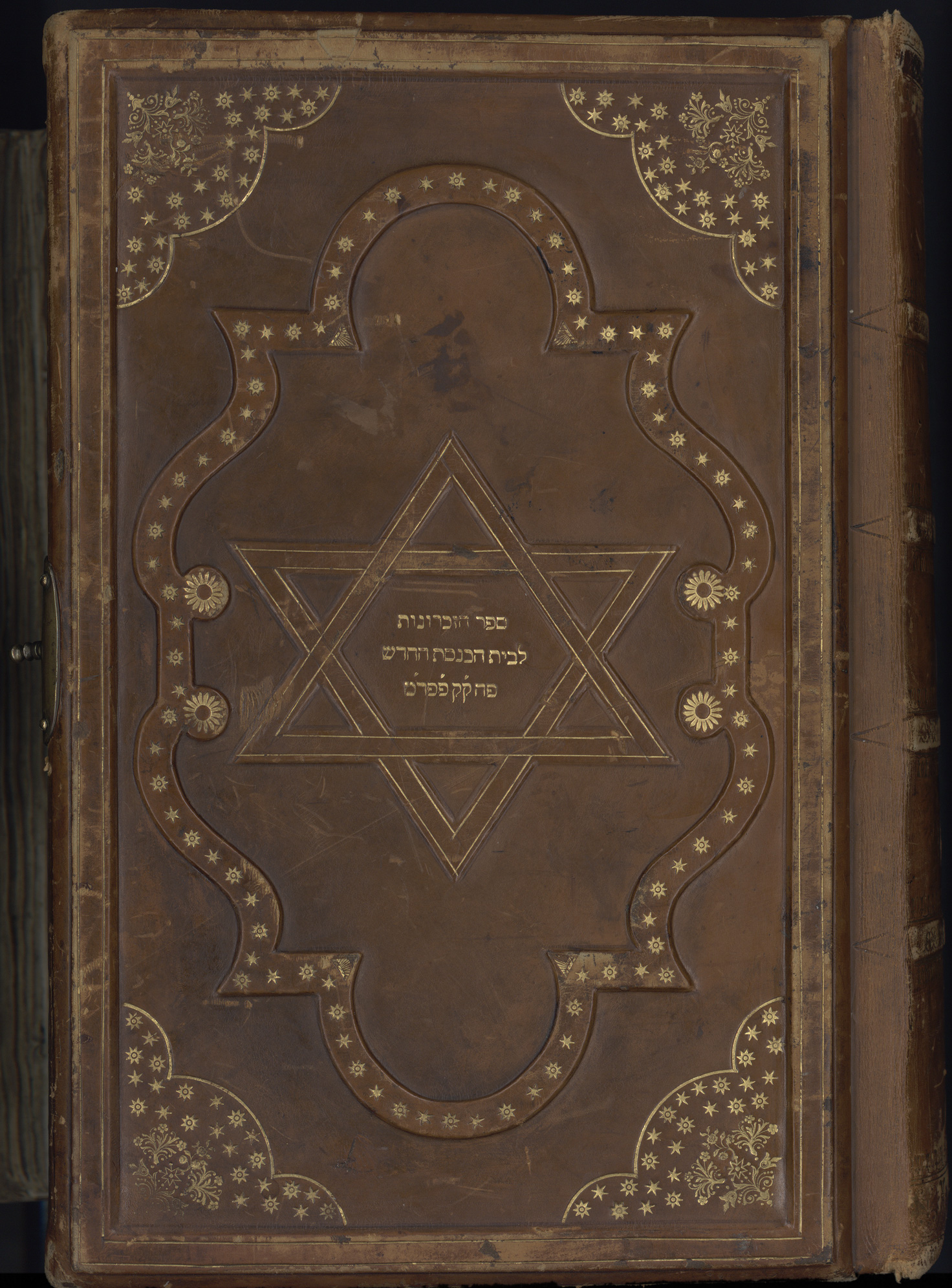
Front cover of the Frankfurter Memorbuch.

A Memorbuch (Yiddish: מעמאָרבוך, romanized: memorbukh, German: Memorbuch, lit. 'memorial book') is a book listing localities or countries in which Jews have been persecuted, together with the names of the martyrs, and necrologies.

== Name ==
The memorbuch was originally called either sefer zikkaron ('Book of Remembrance') or sefer ha-zikhronot ('Book of Commemorations'). The later title, sefer hazkarat neshamot ('Memorial Book of Souls'), was soon superseded by the general name Memorbuch, derived from the Latin: memoria. The names pinḳes ('book,' from the Greek πίναξ), Selbuch, and Totenbuch occur but seldom. The word "memorbuch" is derived from the Latin memoria.

== Contents ==
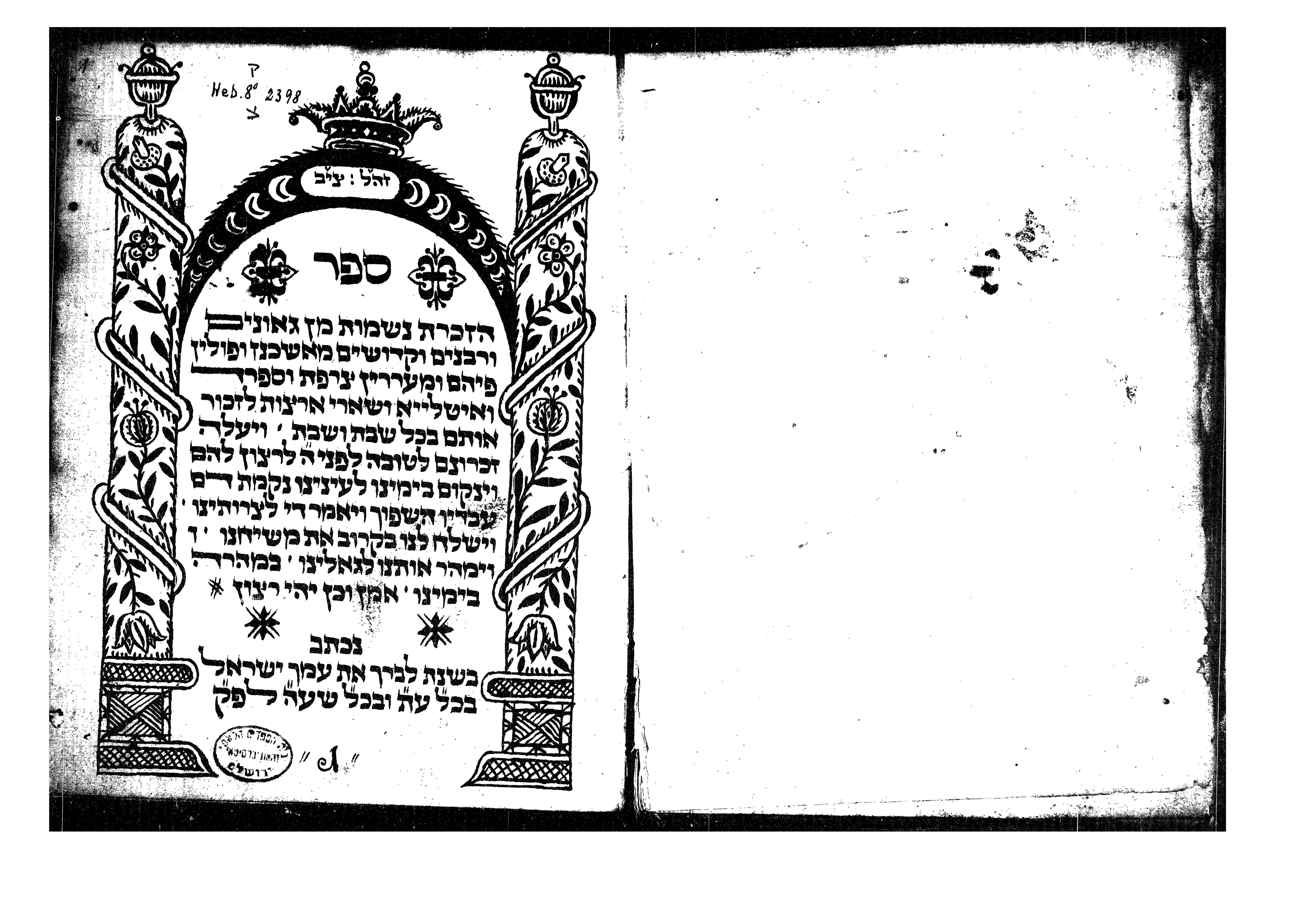
Title page of the nemor-book of the Jewish community of Kleve

After it had become customary to remember scholars, martyrs, benefactors, and others in prayers on the Sabbath and on feast-days, the names of the dead were entered in special books, with the formulas for the hazkarah or the hashkavah, generally beginning with the words: "Yizkor Elohim nishmat ..." ('May God remember the soul of ...'). These books contained, in addition to the general part—the introductory prayers and the names of the noble and beneficent—a simple list of the dead, with notes on their works and the sums spent for the repose of their souls. A list of localities and countries where persecutions had taken place either preceded the necrologies or was added to them.

Memor-books are devoted primarily to the learned and influential, although others may be included for special reasons, particularly Jews distinguished for their noble character, or who performed their duties toward the community with especial faithfulness or who gave or bequeathed gifts to its institutions. These memorials to the dead, which were intended to serve as inspirations to the living, were read wholly or in part at the memorial services. The so-called memmern—the reading of the lists of martyrs and of places of martyrdom—was heard in the synagogue on the Sabbath before Tisha B'Av and on the Sabbath before Shavuot.

== Memorbuch of Nuremberg ==
The earliest known memorbuch is that of the community of Nuremberg, though it likely had predecessors which served as models for it. It was formerly designated by the misleading term "Memorbuch of Mayence," on the authority of Carmoly, Grätz, Neubauer, and others. The book was begun in 1296 by a scribe, Isaac ben Samuel of Meiningen, as a gift to be presented to the community of Nuremberg at the dedication of a new synagogue on 15 November 1296. It was then taken to Mainz, where it was stolen and sold. Subsequently it was acquired by Carmoly, after whose death the Jewish religious society (Israelitische Religionsgesellschaft) of Mainz obtained it. It consists of three parts:

1. the first necrology of the community of Nuremberg, a list of deaths and of gifts from about 1280 to 1346;
2. the martyrologium, a list of martyrs from 1096 to 1349; and
3. the second necrology of the synagogue of Nuremberg, a memor-book and list of deaths and of gifts from 1373 to 1392.

The first necrology, which was probably preceded by forty-four pages containing a history of the persecutions or a cycle of elegies, is prefaced by a prayer on the announcement of the New Moon; a benediction for the members of the community who undertake to keep the fast-day called Sheni ve-Ḥamishi ve-Sheni; a benediction for the benefactors and persons attending the synagogue; a prayer for the sick; and the Av ha-Raḥamim, a prayer for the martyrs of Israel. This is followed by a poem referring to the book, the building, and the dedication of the synagogue, and closing with the words: "The names of the donors have been entered in the Book of the Beloved, who sleep in the grave." Then come the prayers, found in nearly all the memorbuchs, for the souls of the spiritual heroes of Israel and of individual benefactors, and the prayers for the dead (yizkor), in Hebrew and Old French, for the individual martyrs and the persecuted communities. The martyrology is introduced by a summary of the persecutions of 1096 to 1298, the names of the martyrs between 1096 and 1349, a list of cities and villages in which persecutions took place under Rindfleisch (1298) and Armleder (1336–39), and at the time of the Black Death (1348–49). The second necrology is introduced by the ritual for the New Moon and a prayer for the members of the community (Misheberak, almost in the present form), to which are added the same lists and other material as in the first necrology.

== See also ==
- Yizkor books
