= Uissigheim family =

Coat of arms of the Uissigheim family

The Uissigheim family were a minor Frankish German noble family at Uissigheim, south-east of Wertheim. The family - Arnold von Uissigheim "King Armleder" (executed 1336), his father and his brothers - were expelled from their land for ten years in 1333 as the result of a complaint by the Count of Wertheim in 1333. Later members of the family are noted occasionally. The family coat of arms consists of a red and silver checker pattern.
