= Arnold von Uissigheim =

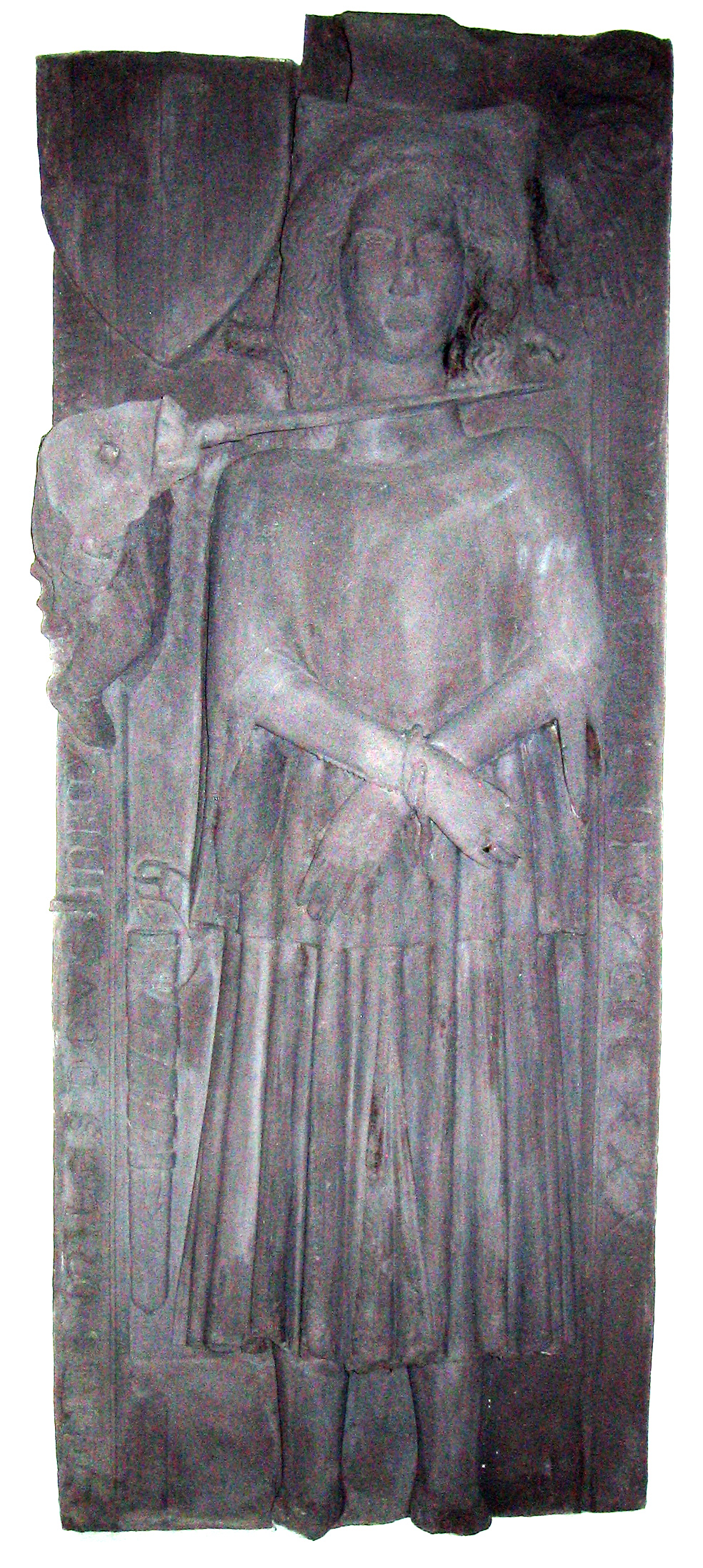
Memorial to Knight Arnold III in der parish church of St. Laurentius in Uissigheim

Arnold III von Uissigheim, also blessed Arnold und "König Armleder", (c.1298–1336) was a medieval German highwayman, bandit, and renegade knight of the Uissigheim family, of the village Uissigheim of the same name. He was the leader of the "Armleder" massacres against Jewish communities throughout the Alsace in 1336.

Arnold became a wanted man in 1332 on the charge of highway robbery in the Wertheim territorium. He then commenced a wave of populist banditry and massacres against the Jewish population of the Alsace. Arnold and 47 of his band were taken captive in 1336, and Arnold tried and sentenced to death by the Zentgericht (regional court) and executed on 14 November 1336.

== See also ==
- Rintfleisch massacres
- Black Death persecutions
