= Uissigheim =

Coordinates: 49°40′45″N 9°34′21″E

Uissigheim is a town district of Külsheim in the Main-Tauber-Kreis. In medieval times it was a village home to the Uissigheim family, of whom the most infamous member was the highwayman and persecutor of the Jews Arnold von Uissigheim (executed 1336).
