= Armleder persecutions =

Antisemitic persecutions

The Armleder persecutions were a series of massacres against Jews in Franconia and Alsace in 1336–1339.

== History ==
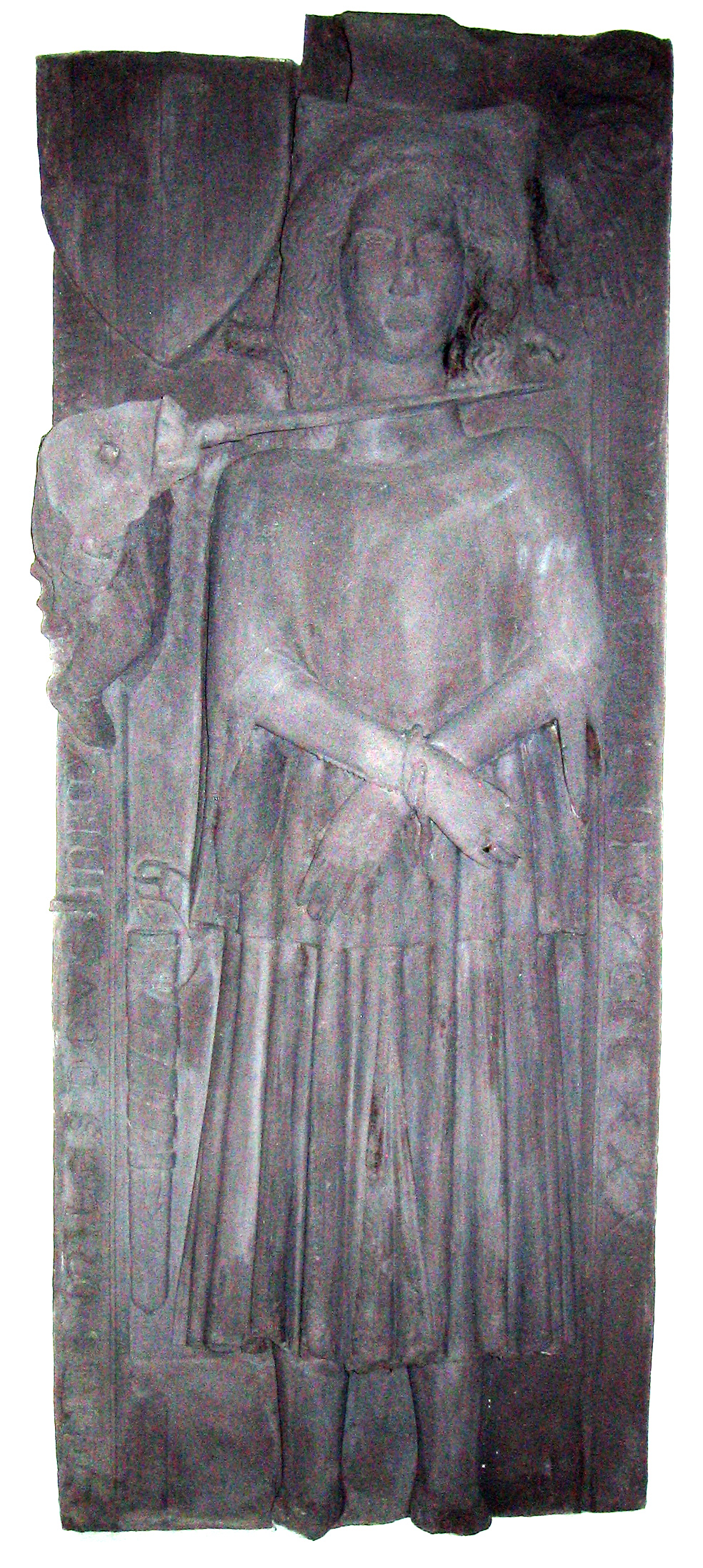
Memorial to Arnold von Uissigheim in the St. Laurentius parish church in Uissigheim

In 1336 a nobleman of Franconia, Arnold von Uissigheim, claiming that an angel had commissioned him to do so, gathered a band of marauders and pillaged and murdered the Jews. These assassins styled themselves Judenschläger (Jewbeaters). Somewhat later John Zimberlin, an innkeeper of Upper Alsace, followed the example set in Franconia. He tied pieces of leather round his arms and bade his followers do the same. This gave rise to the name Armleder ('arm leather'). Their leader was called King Armleder, and under him they marched through Alsace, massacring Jews in some 120 communities, including Rouffach, Ensisheim, Muelhausen, and Ribeauvillé.

Those who were fortunate enough to escape fled to Colmar, where the citizens protected them. Armleder, whom success had intoxicated, besieged the city and devastated the surrounding country. The citizens asked Emperor Louis of Bavaria to assist them. When Armleder heard that the imperial troops were approaching, he fled to France. No sooner had the emperor left the country, however, than Armleder again appeared. The persecutions soon spread to Bavaria, Bohemia, Austria, Styria, and Carinthia.

The lords of Alsace, under the leadership of the bishop of Strasburg, formed an alliance (May 17, 1338), the members of which pledged themselves to pursue Armleder and fifteen of his most prominent followers. But it was very difficult to attack Armleder's adherents; and in the following year a knight, Rudolph of Andlau, made an agreement with King Armleder, granting an amnesty to him and his followers, provided that for the next ten years they would refrain from molesting the Jews. Though attacks ceased for a short time, the Jews, during the ten years of armistice, never lived in security; and in 1349 there occurred the terrible massacres on the occasion of the Black Death, to which the attacks of Armleder had been the prelude.

== See also ==
- Rintfleisch massacres
- Persecution of Jews during the Black Death
