= Rintfleisch massacres =

Series of massacres against Jews in the year 1298

- Location: Franconia, Bavaria, and Austria
- Date: 1298 (April 20 – August 1, 1298)
- Target: Jewish communities
- Attack type: Pogrom
- Deaths: 20,000–100,000 Jews
- Perpetrator: Mob led by Lord Boels von Rindfleisch

The Rintfleisch or Rindfleisch movement was a series of massacres against Jews in 1298, during which 146 communities were destroyed and between 20,000 and 100,000 Jews were killed. The event, in later terminology a pogrom, was the first large-scale persecution in Germany since the First Crusade.

== History ==
It occurred in the Franconian region during the civil strife between the elected King of the Romans, Count Adolf of Nassau, and his Habsburg rival Duke Albert of Austria, when Imperial authority, traditionally concerned with the protection of the Jews, had temporarily collapsed. Already in 1287, the death of Werner of Oberwesel in the Rhineland had been blamed on Jews, and about 500 were killed in an outburst of random violence, followed by a series of blood libels. When King Adolf was finally deposed and killed in the Battle of Göllheim on 2 July 1298, the Franconian nobility gathered at Albert's election in Frankfurt.

When at the same time the Jews in the Hohenlohe town of Röttingen were accused of having obtained and desecrated a consecrated host, one "Lord Boels von Rindtfleisch", who the sources refer to either as an impoverished knight or—more probably—a butcher (the term Rindfleisch means "beef" in modern German spelling), gathered a mob around him and burned the Röttingen Jews on Sunday, April 20. Rintfleisch declared to have received a mandate from heaven to avenge the sacrilege and exterminate the Jews. The Colmar Dominican Rudolph refers to him in Latin as a carnifex, i.e. butcher or executioner, but it is not clear if Rudolph meant his original profession, or his behaviour as a slaughterer of the Jews. According to contemporary sources, the Lord of Röttingen, Kraft Boels von Hohenlohe, was encumbered with debts to Jewish lenders.

After this, he and his mob went from town to town and killed all Jews that fell under their control, destroying the Jewish communities at Rothenburg ob der Tauber, Würzburg, Bamberg, Dinkelsbühl, Nördlingen and Forchheim. In the Free Imperial City of Nuremberg, the Jews sought refuge in the fortress and were assisted by the Christian citizens, but Rintfleisch overcame the defenders and butchered the Jews on 1 August. The Nürnberger Memorbuch contains the names of thousands of murdered Jews in numerous cities, among them Mordechai ben Hillel, a pupil of Meir of Rothenburg, with his wife and children. The communities at Regensburg and Augsburg alone escaped the mass killing, as the cities' magistrates protected them. Spreading from Franconia to Bavaria and Austria, the persecutors destroyed 146 communities, and 20,000–100,000 Jews were killed.

The Austrian Chronicle of 95 Seigneurs about 100 years later alleged that King Albert I finally had Rintfleisch arrested and hanged. The cities in which Jews had been killed were required to pay fines to the king.

== See also ==
- Antisemitism in Germany
- Armleder persecutions
- Black Death persecutions
