= Joseph Yuspa Nördlinger Hahn =

German rabbi (died 1637)

Rabbi Joseph Yuspa Nördlinger Hahn
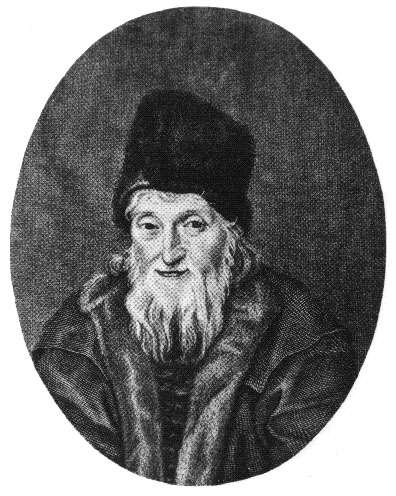

Personal life
- Born: Latter half of the 16th century Frankfurt
- Died: April 3, 1637 Frankfurt
- Buried: Frankfurt
- Parent: Phinehas Seligmann (father)

Religious life
- Religion: Judaism

Joseph Yuspa Nördlinger Hahn (born 1570, died 1637) was a German rabbi and author.

== Biography ==
He was born at Frankfurt in the latter half of the sixteenth century; died there April 3, 1637. He received a good education from his father, the learned rabbi Seligmann. The name "Hahn," as his grandson, Joseph ben Moses Kosman, says in the preface to "Noheg ka-Ẓon Yosef," is derived from the family house called "Zum rothen Hahn." Hahn was the author of "Yosif Omeẓ," (also spelled "Joseph Omeẓ"), which was published at Frankfurt in 1723 by Moses Reiss Darum, son-in-law of Joseph ben Moses Kosman. This work treats of liturgical questions, of the most important moments of religious life, of education, charity, morality, the Christian holidays, and the civil calendar. It is written in a popular style; and short remarks show the author to have been a master of the Halakha. As such he was acknowledged by his contemporaries Rabbis Isaiah Horowitz, author of "Shene Luḥot ha-Berit," and Joel Sirkis, author of "Bayit Ḥadash." He expresses rational views in regard to pedagogics. He recommends adherence to the old rule given in Proverbs 22:6, "Train up a child according to its way" (Authorized Version: "in the way he should go"), and that the scope, method, and subject of instruction be adapted to the capacity of the child: it should not be compelled to learn what is beyond its comprehension. If not fit for the study of the Talmud, it should receive thorough instruction in the Bible, which is plain and wins the heart for the fear of God. In this work, Hahn also tells of the troubles that befell the Frankfurt Jews before and during the persecutions caused by Vincenz Fettmilch, of their expulsion in 1614, and of their readmission in 1616. Hahn was a member of one of the forty families to which the privilege of returning was first granted.

In communal affairs, Hahn also displayed great activity. He founded a society, Gomel Ḥesed, whose duty it was to render the last honors to the dead, especially to such as had no relatives. The congregation conferred upon him offices of honor; and he officiated as rabbi when the rabbinate was vacant. His name is inscribed in the "memorial book," and his Hebrew epitaph (No. 1590) is found on one of the monuments of the Jewish cemetery of Frankfurt.

Another work of Hahn's, containing explanations and glosses to the four codes of the Shulchan Aruch, is still in manuscript.
