= Portuguese Jewish community in Hamburg =

From about 1590 on, there had been a Portuguese Jewish community in Hamburg, whose qehilla (קהילה "congregation") existed until its compulsory merger with the Ashkenazi congregation in July 1939. The first Sephardic settlers were Portuguese Marranos, who had fled their country under Philip II and Philip III, at first concealing their religion in their new place of residence. Many of them had emigrated from Spain in the belief that they had found refuge in Portugal.

== Seventeenth century ==
In 1603 the aldermen ("Bürgerschaft") made complaints to the senate (city government) about the growing influx of Portuguese Jews. The senate asked the Lutheran theological faculties of Jena and Frankfort-on-the-Oder for their opinions in the matter, and, after many negotiations, it was agreed that, in consideration of a payment made for their protection, the Sephardim should be tolerated in the town as strangers, though they were not to be allowed to practise their religion publicly.

This practice was neither new nor unique in the city's policy. Immigrants, many as refugees during the Thirty Years' War, were differently treated according to their religion and denomination, all non-Lutherans, Anglican Britons (Merchant Adventurers of London, in Hamburg 1563–1577, and again 1611), Catholics, Jews, and Reformed (Calvinist) Dutch merchants were forbidden to publicly perform their religion. "Lutheran refugees, in contrast, were rapidly absorbed into the population. … With so-called “foreigner contracts” (Fremdenkontrakte) in 1605, the senate regulated the city's relationship to its other refugees, mostly Calvinists, in return for an annual tax. In 1612, the Sephardic Jewish community also received foreign contracts, as did the Ashkenazi community soon thereafter." Thus the senate argued towards the aldermen, that the Sephardim were just another group of foreign merchants enhancing Hamburg's international commercial relations, emphasising their Portuguese nationality.

By its "Kaufmannshantierung" (merchant regulation) the senate granted all foreign merchants, including the Portuguese equal rights as to export, import and wholesale trade in 1612, while all crafts, dominated by the guilds, remained closed for foreigners. According to a "rolla" or list of that time, they numbered 125 adults, besides servants and children. From 1611 they possessed a cemetery in the neighbouring Holstein-Pinneberg city of Altona, which was used until 1871. In 1617 they obtained the right to choose four sworn brokers from among their own people as members of Bourse of Hamburg (Germany's first stock exchange); and later on this number was increased to fifteen. In the wake of the establishment of the Sephardic community also Ashkenazi Jews gained - since 1610 - for the first time access to the city, however, at first only as employees in Sephardic households or companies.

These Portuguese Jews, mainly engaged in the wholesale trade, greatly helped the commerce of the town. They were the first to open up trade with Spain and Portugal; they imported from the colonies sugar, tobacco, spices, cotton, etc., and they took a prominent part in the foundation of the Bank of Hamburg (1619). Of their eminent men the best known is the physician Rodrigo de Castro, who lived in Hamburg from 1594 till his death in 1630. In recognition of his valuable professional services the senate granted him the privilege of owning real estate in the town. Other notables were: Jacob Rosales, alias Manuel Boccarro Francês y Rosales and Hector Rosales (1588–1662, in Hamburg 1632–1655?), who distinguished himself as an astronomer, Emperor Ferdinand III conferring upon him the title of "comes palatinus (Pfalzgraf)" in 1647, he further served as Spanish minister resident to the cities of Hamburg and Lübeck; Joseph Francês, the poet; Moses Gideon Abudiente (1600–1688, in Hamburg since the 1620s), the grammarian; and Benjamin Musaphia (1606–1673, in Hamburg 1634?–1643), the physician (personal doctor of King Christian IV of Denmark), philosopher, linguist, and chargé d'affaires of Frederick III, Duke of Holstein-Gottorp.

As early as the year 1627 the Portuguese Jews possessed a small place of worship, styled Talmud Torah (תלמוד תורה), in the house of Elijah Aboab Cardoso. Emperor Ferdinand II addressed bitter complaints to the senate about this "synagogue", the Catholics not being allowed to build a church in Hamburg at that time. But, in spite of this protest and the violent attacks of the Lutheran clergy, the senate continued to protect the Jews. Their first Ḥacham (חכם) was Isaac Athias of Venice, whose successor was Abraham Ḥayyim de Fonseca (d. Iyyar, 5411 = 1651), also Ḥacham of another synagogue, Keter Torah (כתר תורה). A further congregation established, named Neveh Shalom (נוה שלום). In 1652 the three Portuguese congregations formally constituted themselves as Holy Community of the Sephardim of Beit Israel (בית ישראל) with a large synagogue of the same name, and chose as Chief Rabbi ("Ḥacham da naçao") the learned David Cohen de Lara (d. 1674). With him Ḥacham Moses Israel, and, a little later, Judah Carmi were rabbis of the congregation (both died in 1673). In 1656 Isaac Jesurun was called from Venice to Hamburg, there to take the place of Chief Rabbi ("Ḥacham geral") "for the promotion of religion and the general welfare," as the oldest minute-book of the congregation says. Apparently offended by this call, Cohen de Lara took leave for a few months and afterward went to live at Amsterdam. After the death of Jesurun (1665), De Lara went back to Hamburg, where he died.

Among the early elders of the congregation was Benedict de Castro, a son of Rodrigo, and, like his father, a well-known physician (personal doctor of Christina of Sweden). In 1663 the Sephardic congregation, at that time the only acknowledged Jewish community at Hamburg, consisted of about 120 families. Among these were several distinguished by wealth and political influence: Daniel Abensur (d. 1711) was minister resident of the Polish-Saxon Augustus II the Strong in Hamburg; Jacob Curiel (1587-1665) alias Duarte Nunes da Costa, acted in a similar capacity to the King of Portugal; Diego (Abraham) Texeira (1581–1666, in Hamburg since 1646) and his son Manuel (Isaac) Texeira (1630/31-1705, in Hamburg until 1698), who consulted Duke Frederick III of Holstein-Gottorp, King Frederick III of Denmark and Queen Christina of Sweden in financial affairs, also administering her fortune after her abdication. From 1655 Manuel was the celebrated minister resident of the former Queen Christina in Hamburg. Jacob Sasportas taught from 1666 to 1672 at a beth midrash founded by Manuel Texeira, and was often called upon, as Ḥacham, to decide religious questions. By the 1660s also an Ashkenazi congregation, without any legal recognition, had formed.

Hamburg's Sephardim took great interest in the movements of the false Messiah Shabbethai Zebi. They arranged celebrations in his honor in their principal synagogue, the young men wearing trimmings and sashes of green silk, "the livery of Shabbethai Zebi." Sasportas tried in vain to damp this enthusiasm, which was to be bitterly disappointed a few years later. Other rabbis of the congregation were Jacob ben Abraham Fidanque, Moses Ḥayyim Jesurun (d. 1691), Samuel Abaz (d. 1692), and Abraham ha-Kohen Pimentel (d. 1697).

In 1697 the freedom of religious practice which the congregation had obtained was disturbed by hostile edicts of the aldermen, and the Jews were extortionately taxed (Cf. Taxes on the Jews in Altona and Hamburg). On this account many of the rich and important Portuguese Jews left Hamburg, some of them laying the foundation of the Portuguese congregation of Altona, since 1640 part of Danish Holstein. Internal quarrels, and especially the withdrawal of Jacob Abensur (minister resident of Augustus II the Strong) and his followers, were other causes of the decline of the Sephardic congregation in Hamburg.

== Eighteenth and nineteenth centuries ==
In 1710 an imperial commission, which visited the town for the purpose of making peace between the senate and the aldermen, fixed the position of Hamburg's Ashkenazi and Sephardi Jews by certain regulations ("Reglement der Judenschaft in Hamburg sowohl portugiesischer als hochdeutscher Nation", Regulation of the Jewry of Portuguese as well as of High German Nation in Hamburg), promulgated in the name of Emperor Joseph I. This edict became the fundamental law for the treatment of the Jews in Hamburg during the ensuing century.

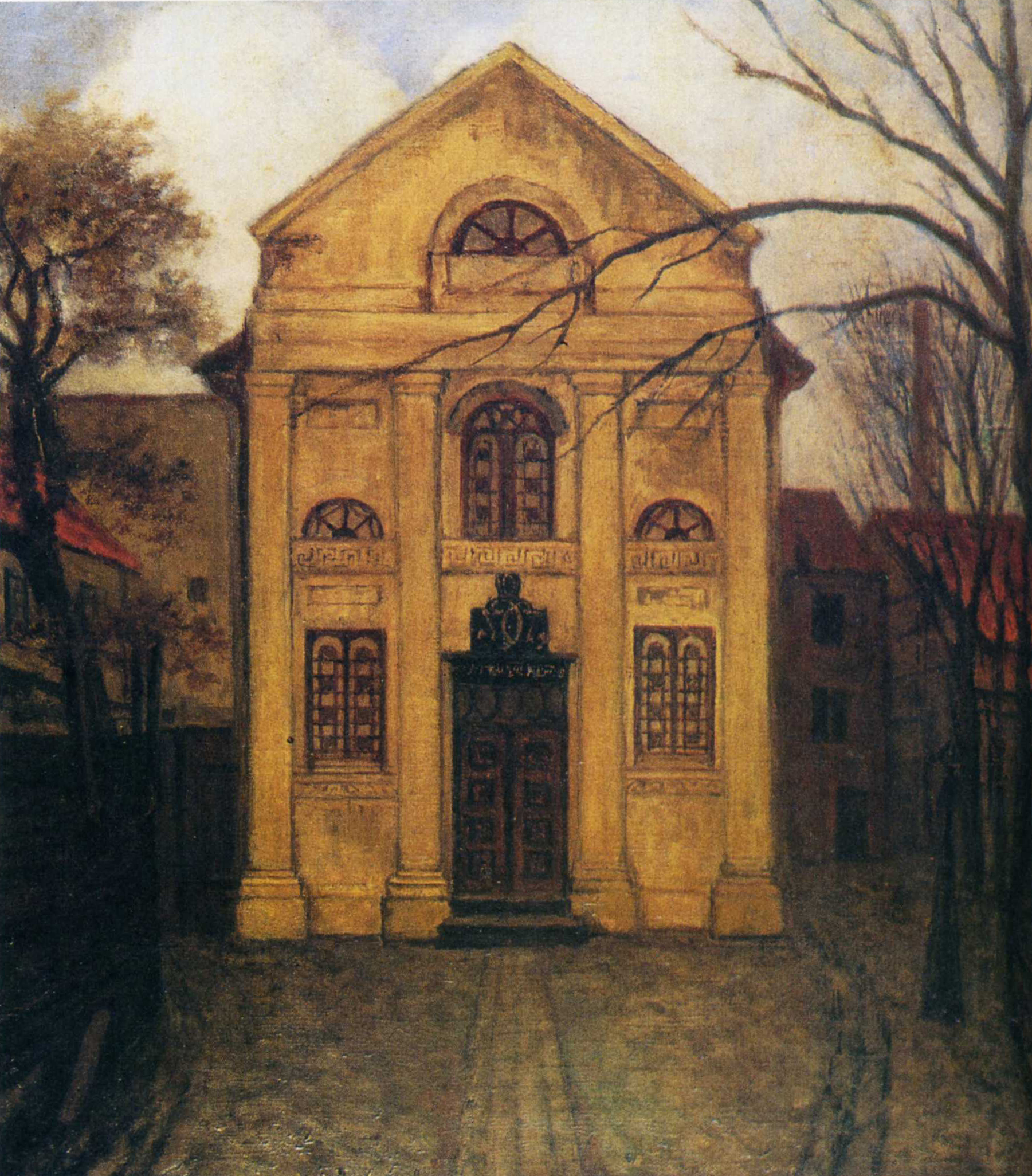
The main façade of stone of the else half-timbered Portuguese synagogue Neveh Shalom in the courtyard of then Bäckerstr. 12-14 (today's Hoheschulstr.), Altona, dedicated in 1771, closed in 1882. Thereafter Altona's Ashkenazi congregation used the building as winter synagogue, before it was demolished in 1940.

The Portuguese, proud of their noble lineage, were very dissatisfied at being put on a level with the German Jews, and segregated themselves more and more from them. As a result of this exclusiveness, and for want of fresh accessions, their community declined in the course of the eighteenth century and lost its leading position among the Hamburg Jews. Still, it had some well-known Ḥachamim, for example Jacob de Abraham Basan, who wrote an order of prayers (still extant) for a fast-day held after the 1755 Lisbon earthquake, and Benjamin Benveniste (d. 1757). But learning and interest in Jewish affairs waned in the Portuguese community, and its institutions were neglected. The shechitah, formerly under its sole supervision, went over to the Ashkenazi community, which in exchange had to pay to the Portuguese one-fourth (since 1856 one-eighth) of the total proceeds of the meat-tax.

By the annexation of Hamburg into the first French Empire in 1810, all Hamburgers became French citizens of equal rights, though the Jews among them were discriminated by Napoléon Bonaparte's so-called décret infâme. The Holy Community of the Sephardim of Beit Israel became subject to the Israelite Central Consistory of France. In 1814 Hamburg resumed independence and sovereignty as a city-state, and in the following year the senate deprived the Jews their legal equality. Arguing it was the French state and not the Free and Hanseatic City of Hamburg which had emancipated the Jews in town, the senate took the decisions of the German Confederation on the rights of the Jews, in Johann Smidt's manipulated formulation, as the legal grounds. The old Reglement der Judenschaft regained legal validity.

The Portuguese congregation's principal synagogue in Alter Wall was burned in the great city fire of 1842. From 1855 to 1935 the Sephardim possessed a smaller new place of worship in Markusstrasse 36, the service being maintained with all the old Spanish rites and melodies. Since the beginning of the nineteenth century they had no Ḥacham. The members of the congregation were granted equal rights (Jewish emancipation) by the city-state on 21 February 1849, adopting the legislation of the Frankfurt National Assembly. Their last preacher and spiritual chief was Judah Cassuto, who officiated as Ḥazzan (חזן) from 1827 to 1893. It is thought that in 1905 the Portuguese community numbered about 400.

In Altona, Prussian since 1866, but incorporated into Hamburg in 1937, Sephardim had settled since before 1647. Their congregation was first known as Beit Yacob ha-Katan (בית יעקב הקטן). In 1770 they founded the Holy Community of Neveh Shalom (נוה שלום). They gained legal equality on 14 July 1863 through an act of the Danish-Holsteinian government. In 1887 the few remaining congregants had to dissolve the community due to lack of members.

== Twentieth century ==
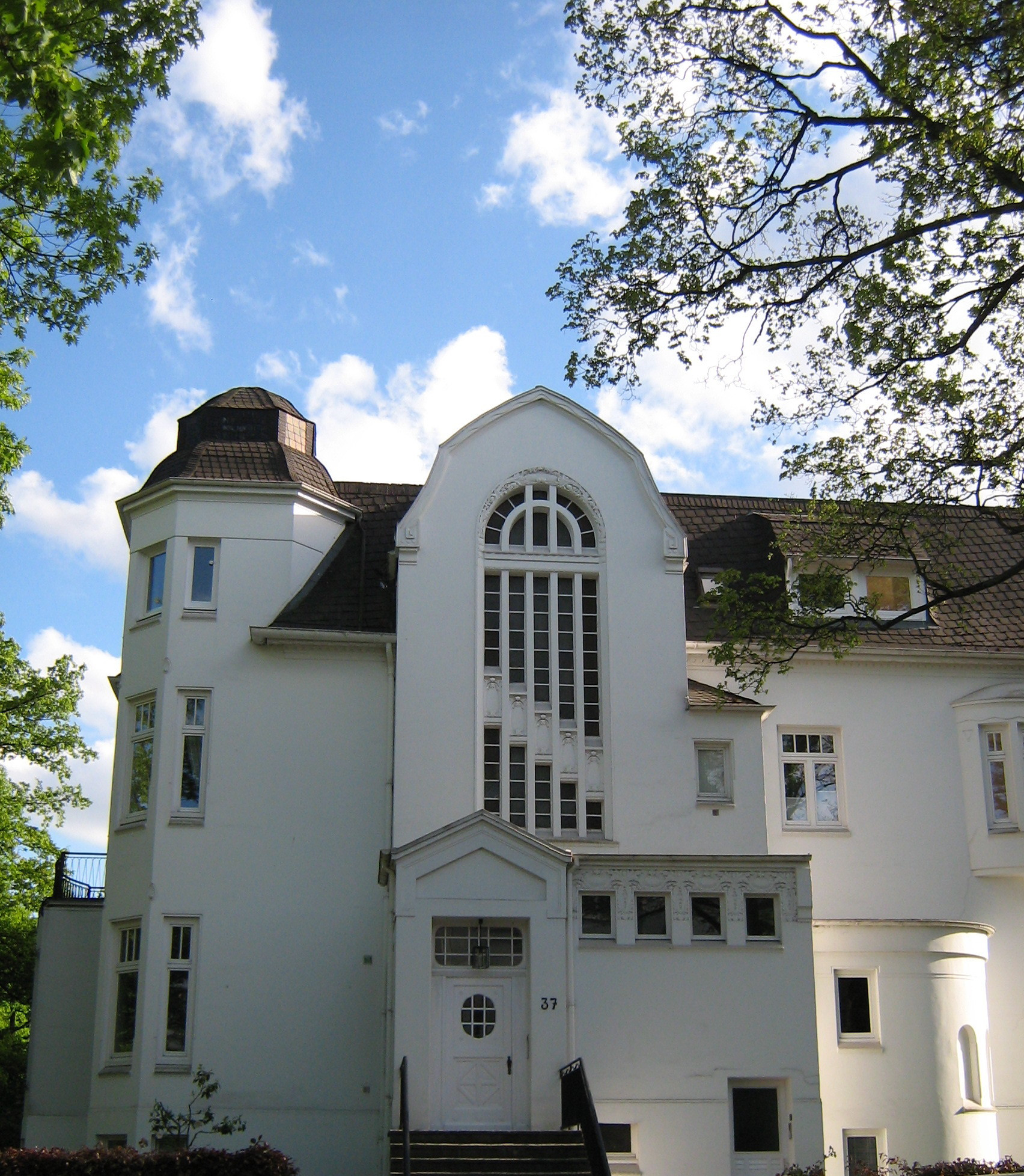
Residential building 'Innocentiastrasse #37' in Harvestehude. 1935–39 the building was rented by the Sephardic congregation and used as its last synagogue.

By the time of the Nazi era, Hamburg's tiny Sephardic congregation had become the only one of its kind in Germany. While all antisemitic discriminations hit its members as hard as the Ashkenazim, the congregation was not the main target of aggressive active assaults. In 1935 the congregation, comprising 150 members, moved its synagogue into a villa in Innocentiastr. #37 and left the old synagogue to the Ashkenazi congregation of Hamburg. The Sephardic synagogue was not attacked in the night of the November Pogrom.

In July 1939 the Nazi government abolished Jewish congregations as religious organisations and transformed them into subordinate branches of the police administration in charge of publicising and supervising the observance of the ever-growing number of antisemitic invidiousnesses. Therefore, all persons classified as Jews according to the Nuremberg Laws were compulsorily enlisted as members, including Catholics, irreligionists and Protestants, of whose grandparents three to four had been enrolled in a Jewish congregation. The Holy Community of the Sephardim of Beit Israel had to merge in the formerly Ashkenazi Jüdischer Religionsverband in Hamburg, now also comprising the aforementioned Gentiles, since the Nazis allowed for their purposes only one community of the new type in every town.

Systematic deportations of Jewish Germans and Gentile Germans of Jewish descent started on 18 October 1941. These were all directed to Ghettos in Nazi-occupied Europe or to concentration camps. Most deported persons were murdered in the Shoah, and roughly 7,800 Jews from Hamburg were murdered during the Nazi era.

By the end of 1942 the Jüdischer Religionsverband in Hamburg was dissolved as independent legal entity and its remaining assets and staff was assumed by the Reichsvereinigung der Juden in Deutschland (District Northwest). On 10 June 1943 the Reichssicherheitshauptamt dissolved the Reichsvereinigung by a decree. The few remaining employees not somewhat protected by a mixed marriage were deported from Hamburg on 23 June 1943 to Theresienstadt.

== Bibliography ==
=== Cited in Jewish Encyclopedia ===
- Protocol-Book and Acts of the Portuguese Congregation (unpublished)
- Acts of the Municipal Archives of Hamburg (unpublished)

=== Other ===
- Arno Herzig, "Frühe Neuzeit", in: Das Jüdische Hamburg: ein historisches Nachschlagewerk, Kirsten Heinsohn (ed.) on behalf of the Institut für die Geschichte der deutschen Juden, Göttingen: Wallstein, 2006, p. 82. ISBN 3-8353-0004-0.
- Mein Vater war portugiesischer Jude …: Die sefardische Einwanderung nach Norddeutschland um 1600 und ihre Auswirkungen auf unsere Kultur, Sabine Kruse and Bernt Engelmann (eds.), Göttingen: Steidl, 1992, 224 pp.
- Poettering, Jorun, Migrating Merchants. Trade, Nation, and Religion in Seventeenth-Century Hamburg and Portugal, Berlin, De Gruyter Oldenbourg, 2019.

== See also ==
- History of the Jews in Hamburg
- History of the Jews in Affaltrach
