= Sarah Judith de Castro =

British painter

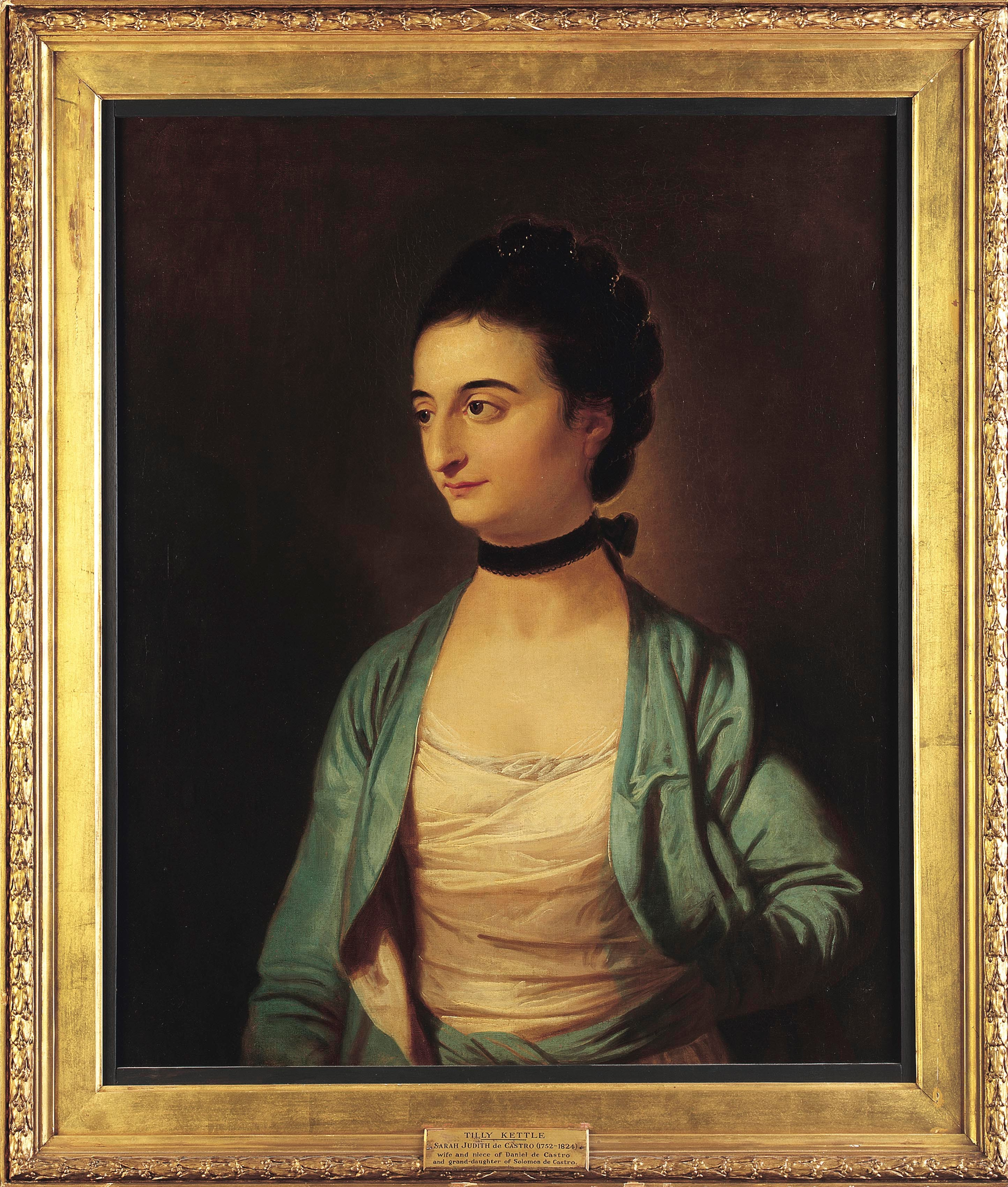
- portrait by Tilly Kettle
- Born: 1752
- Died: 23 May 1824 (aged 71–72); Stoke Newington
- Occupation: Painter
- Spouse(s): Daniel de Castro

Sarah Judith de Castro (1752 – 23 May 1824) was a British painter from a family of Anglo-Jewish merchants.

Sarah Judith de Castro was born in 1752, the only daughter of David de Castro. After her father died in 1761, she married her uncle, her father's youngest brother Daniel de Castro, in 1766, when she was fourteen years old. Their avunculate marriage may have been intended to keep money within the de Castro family.

She exhibited flower paintings at the Royal Academy in 1777 and 1778. If any of her works are extant, they have not been identified. Portraits of her and her husband by Tilly Kettle (originally attributed to Johan Zoffany) are in the collection of London's Jewish Museum.

Sarah Judith de Castro died on 23 May 1824 in Stoke Newington.
