= Abraham de Castro =

Ottoman Jewish financialist and head of the mint (d. 1560)

- אברהם קסטרו
- Born: Possibly Spain
- Died: 1560; Jerusalem, Ottoman Empire
- Occupations: Financier, head of the mint
- Known for: Involvement in the Cairo Purim

Abraham de Castro (Hebrew: אברהם קסטרו; d. 1560) was an Ottoman Jewish financier who served as the head of the mint for Ottoman Sultan, Selim I and played an active role in the Cairo Purim.

== Biography ==
Possibly born in Spain, into the de Castro family, he may have come to Egypt following the Alhambra decree of 1492. It was in Ottoman Egypt, that de Castro rose to great social prominence, especially in official government circles. He leased the taxes on customs and trade in Alexandria, and in 1520, Selim I, appointed de Castro as master of the mint (mu'allim dār al-darb). After this appointment, de Castro became involved in several philanthropic activities on behalf of individuals and institutions in Egypt. Although, following the succession of Suleiman the Magnificent, a certain Aḥmad Pasha was appointed as Viceroy of Egypt. In 1523, Pasha plotted to establish himself as an independent sovereign, and asked de Castro to mint the coins with his name in lieu of the sultan. de Castro secretly left Egypt and hastened to Constantinople to inform the sultan of Aḥmad's plot. The sultan received him with high honors and gave him costly presents. After hearing of de Castro's actions, Pasha threatened to murder all the Jews in Cairo, although this massacre was evaded after Pasha was stabbed to death by one of his junior officers, leading to the event later being known as the "Cairo Purim". By the late 1530s, de Castro had moved to Jerusalem, where he played a central role in the city's Jewish society, primarily in its economic life, mainly dealing with real estate. Castro evidently remained in Jerusalem until his death in 1560.
