= Abraham Zacutus Lusitanus =

Portuguese medical historian (1575–1642)

- Born: 1575
- Died: 1642 (aged 66–67)

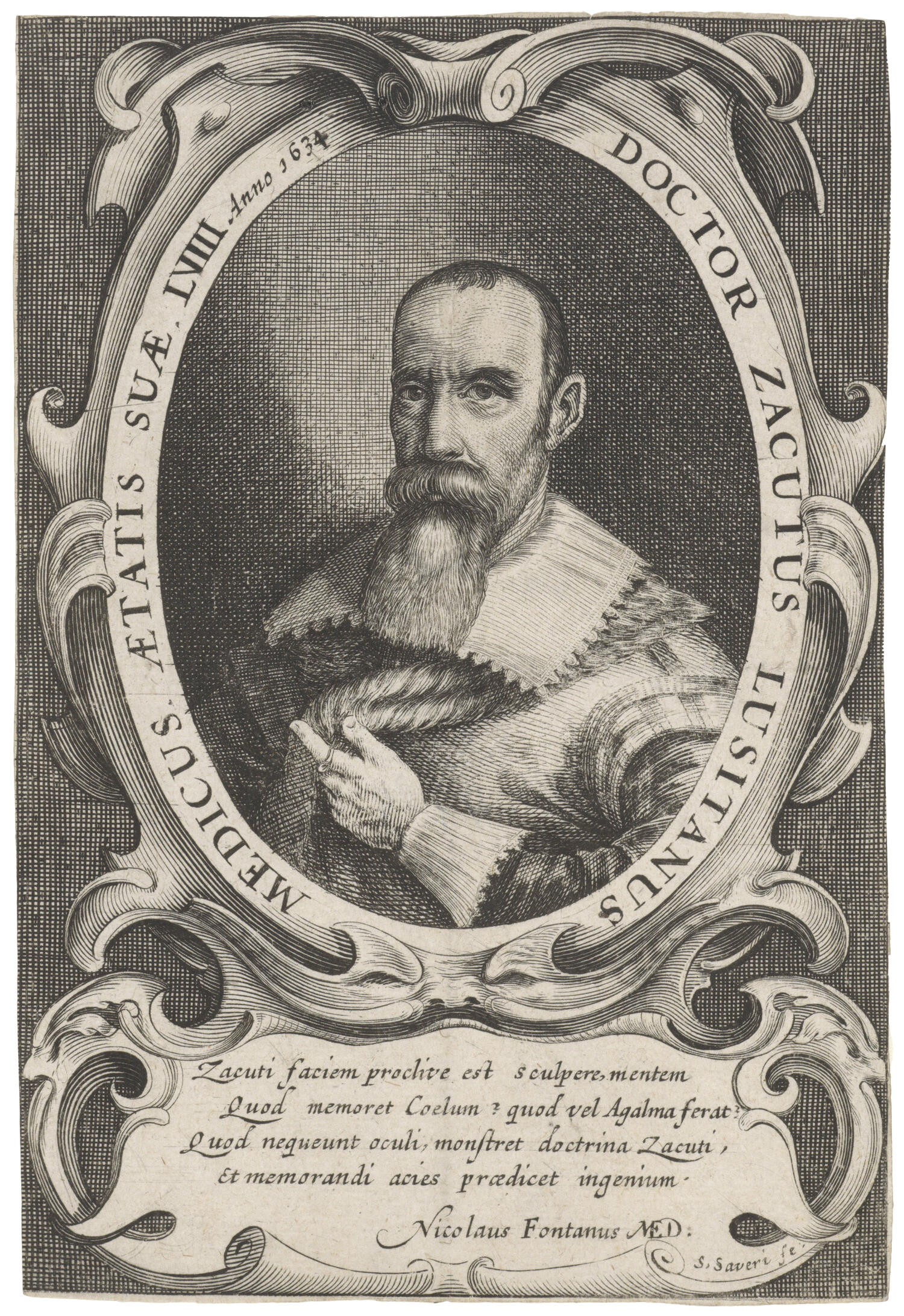
Salomon Savery, Portret van de arts Abraham Zacutus Lusitanus, 1634. Rijksmuseum, Amsterdam.

Abraham Zacutus Lusitanus (Abraham Zacuto IV, Zacuti Lusitani, 1575–1642, also known as Manuel Alvares de Tavara), was a Sephardic Jewish Marrano or converso physician from Lisbon who was the author of a handbook of medical information.

== Biography ==
Zacutus studied medicine at the University of Salamanca and the University of Coimbra in Spain and Portugal before fleeing the Spanish Inquisition to Holland. As a physician, he developed a strong reputation in Portugal which he carried with him to the Collegium Medicum in Amsterdam. He was a descendant of Abraham Zacuto, his namesake.

The 1629–1642 12 volume encyclopedia De Medicorum Principum Historia published by Henricus Laurentius is his most-well-known work. He conceived of his work as a praxis historialis and it contains 200 historiae from Galen. Considered imaginative by his contemporaries, in his praxis medica admiranda, snakes, scorpions, lizards, and hens are thought of as gastrointestinal parasites, and he also describes a woman giving birth to a salamander, and a man who urinated a cloud of flies. He also discussed a case that he describes as lovesickness.

Zacutus wrote about plague, diphtheria, fevers, and malignant growths, and was one of the first to describe black water fever, and contributed to knowledge of syphilis. He was cited by later physicians such as Astruc and Carvalho. He was aware of Harvey's work on the heart and blood circulation, but committed errors in anatomy he had mislearned from Galen. He is considered a literary, if not a scientific, conservative. He discusses some surgery as well, including the lengths of incisions for abscesses.

As a New Christian convert, he was sometimes viewed with suspicion by the "Old Christians". In 1631 he asked Benedictus de Castro to take action against the Christian detractors of Portuguese-Jewish medicine.
