= Fettmilch uprising =

Antisemitic pogrom in Frankfurt

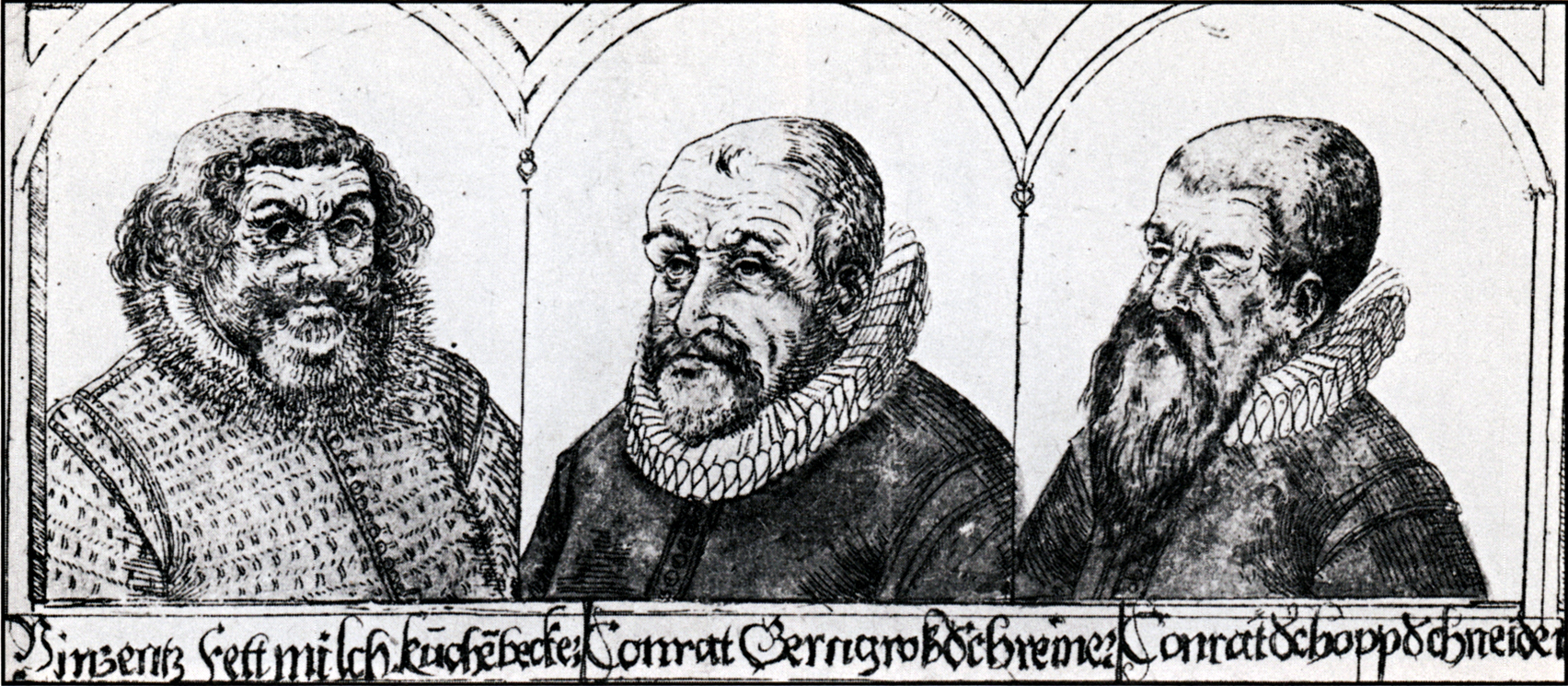
Vinzenz Fettmilch, Conrad Gerngross and Conrad Schopp, the leaders of the pogrom, print, 1614

The Fettmilch uprising (German: Fettmilch-Aufstand) of 1614 was an antisemitic revolt in the Free imperial city of Frankfurt am Main, led by baker Vincenz Fettmilch. It was initially a revolt by the guilds against the mismanagement of the patrician-dominated city council, that culminated in the pillaging of the Frankfurter Judengasse (Jewish quarter) and the expulsion of Frankfurt's entire Jewish population, the worst outbreak of antisemitism in Germany between the fourteenth century and the 1930s. The uprising lasted from May until it was finally defeated in November through the intervention of the Holy Roman Emperor, the Landgrave of Hesse-Kassel, and the Archbishop of Mainz.

== Background ==
The uprising had its origins in the consolidation of the patrician regime in Frankfurt at the end of the 16th century, along with the discontent of the citizens about the council's mismanagement of the city and the limited influence of the guilds on civic politics. These political complaints of the guilds were intertwined with antisemitic sentiment from the beginning.

=== Outbreak of disorder ===
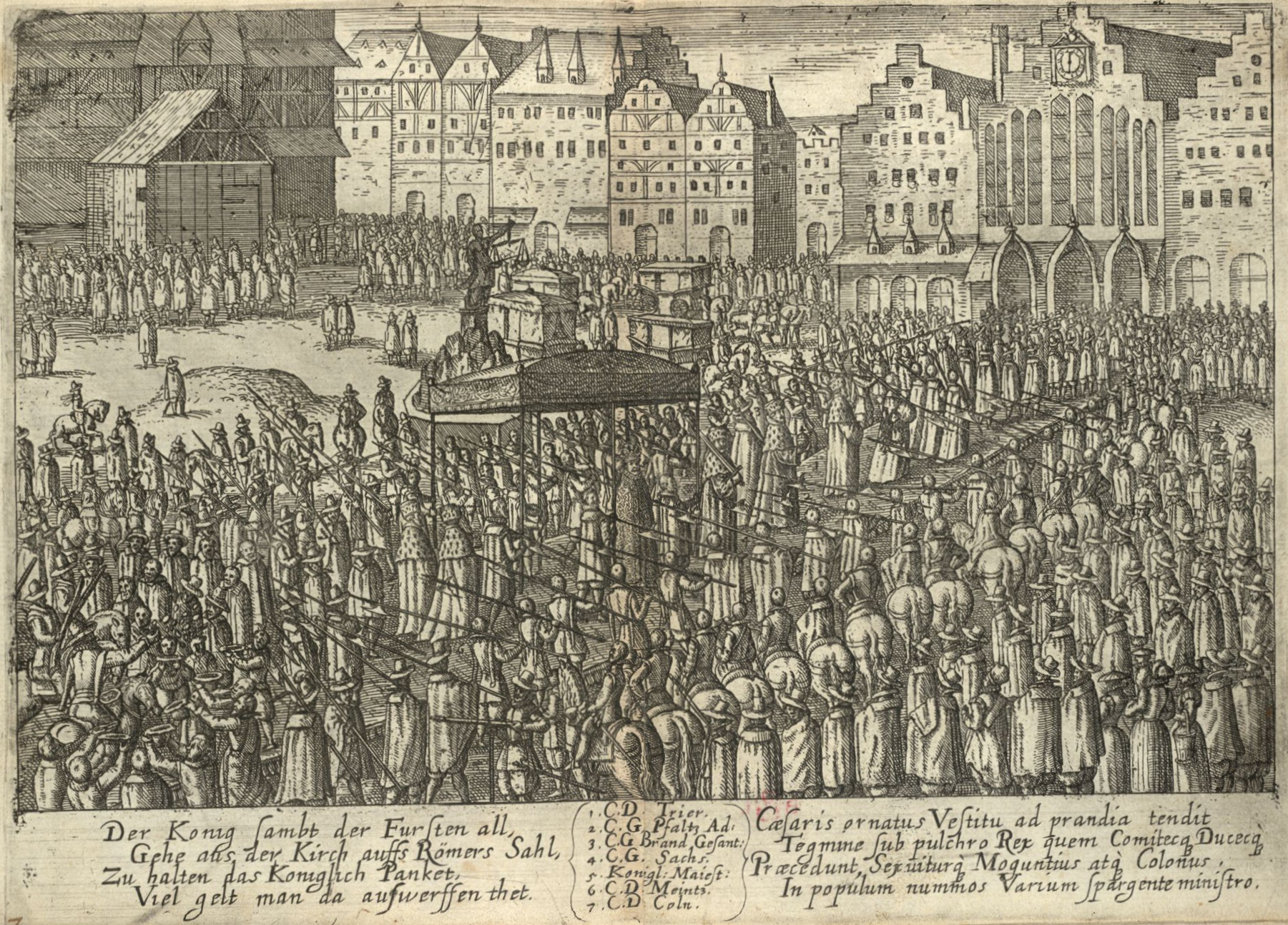
Coronation parade in front of the Frankfurt Römer for Emperor Matthias, on 13 June 1612.

The unrest began on 9 June 1612, when the citizens and guildmasters demanded that the privileges of the city be read out publicly by the city council (German: Rat) before the election of the new emperor, Matthias, as had been customary in earlier times. This had last occurred 36 years earlier, before the election of Matthias' predecessor Rudolf II. The city council denied the citizens' demand, leading to rumours that the council was planning to withhold information from them about the tax exemptions that would be awarded by the new Emperor.

Moreover, the citizens wanted a greater say in civic government. The 42-member city council was dominated by the 24 members from the "patrician" families belonging to the Alten Limpurg society. This was the part of the Frankfurt patriciate who had a noble lifestyle and lived off ground rents rather than from commerce or trade. Alten Limpurg was opposed by another patrician society Zum Frauenstein, which contained the city's wholesalers, and shared the remaining 18 seats with representatives of the artisans' guilds. This arrangement of seats was fixed. Furthermore, there were no general elections; voting only took place when a particular councillor resigned or died, in order to select his successor.

The guildmasters were also pushing for the establishment of a public cornmarket in Frankfurt, in order to bring about lower grain prices, and a decrease in the interest rate charged by Frankfurt's Jews from 12% to 6%. The Calvinists were demanding an equal civic position to that of the Lutherans and would later support the uprising in greater numbers than them. In addition to these concrete but very diverse demands, there was a general discontent that had been brewing for decades about the perceived self-servingness of the council, which had begun referring to the citizens as "subjects" in its public pronouncements.

The antisemitic aspect of the uprising owed something to the merchants, craftsmen, and others who were in debt to moneylenders in the Frankfurt Jewish quarter, the Judengasse. They hoped to get rid of their debts by getting rid of their creditors.

=== The citizens' contract ===
In the conflict about reading of the privileges, the shopkeeper and gingerbread-baker Vinzenz Fettmilch, who had been a citizen of the city since 1593, was the guildmasters' spokesman. After being rebuffed by the council, they turned first to the prince-electors and their representatives, who were present in Frankfurt to hold the election of the emperor, and finally to the new emperor himself, when he arrived in Frankfurt for the coronation. Initially, the electors and the emperor refused to get involved in the internal affairs of Frankfurt. But when the guilds formed a committee to negotiate with the council, Matthias established a commission to arbitrate the dispute.

This commission, which was led by the neighbouring lords, the Archbishop-elector of Mainz and the Landgrave of Hesse-Kassel, was seen by the Frankfurt patricians as a threat to their status. Moreover, they feared that the disorder would have a negative impact on the Messe (the city's market). Nürnberg and other trade cities had already submitted formal queries to the Frankfurt government, about whether it could guarantee the safety of foreign merchants. Therefore, on 21 December 1612, the council voluntarily concluded an agreement, the "citizens' contract" (German: Bürgervertrag). This new civic constitution, which remained in force until 1806, expanded the council's membership by 18 seats and established a nine-man committee representing the guilds, which had the right to audit the city's financial accounts. In 1614, the newly expanded council elected Nicolaus Weitz as the new Stadtschultheiß (akin to a mayor).

=== Renewed crisis ===
When the new audit process took place in 1613, it turned out that Frankfurt was deeply in debt and that the council had expended, among other things, the fund that it should have used for supporting the poor and the sick. The tax-collectors had embezzled money from fines for their own use. In addition, it became known that the patrician Johann Friedrich Faust von Aschaffenburg had tried to get the emperor to block the passage of the citizens' contract.

A further conflict concerned the "Judenstättigkeit", the ordinance which regulated the lives of Frankfurt's Jews. The protection money which the Jews were required to pay under this ordinance had not gone into the civic treasury. Instead, the council members had shared it among themselves. To prevent this illegal act from becoming public, the council had all printed copies of the Judenstättigkeit confiscated. At the same time, rumours spread that the Jews had made common cause with the patricians. Vincenz Fettmilch finally published the edict which Emperor Charles IV had granted to the Jews of Frankfurt in 1349. This contained the fateful sentence, stating that the emperor would not hold the city responsible if the Jews "departed into death, perished, or were slain." Many took this as permission to undertake a pogrom.

== The uprising ==
On 6 May 1613, after the enormous size of Frankfurt's debt – 9.5 tonnes of gold guilders – had been made public, a crowd stormed the Römer (the Frankfurt city council building) and forced them to hand the keys to the city treasury over to the nine-man committee of the guilds. In the following months, the council was only able to spend money that the committee granted to it. On the grounds that both sides had breached the recently agreed citizen's contract, the emperor intervened, pushing for a compromise. On 15 January 1614, both parties signed a new contract.

=== Deposition of the Council and threat of the Imperial ban ===
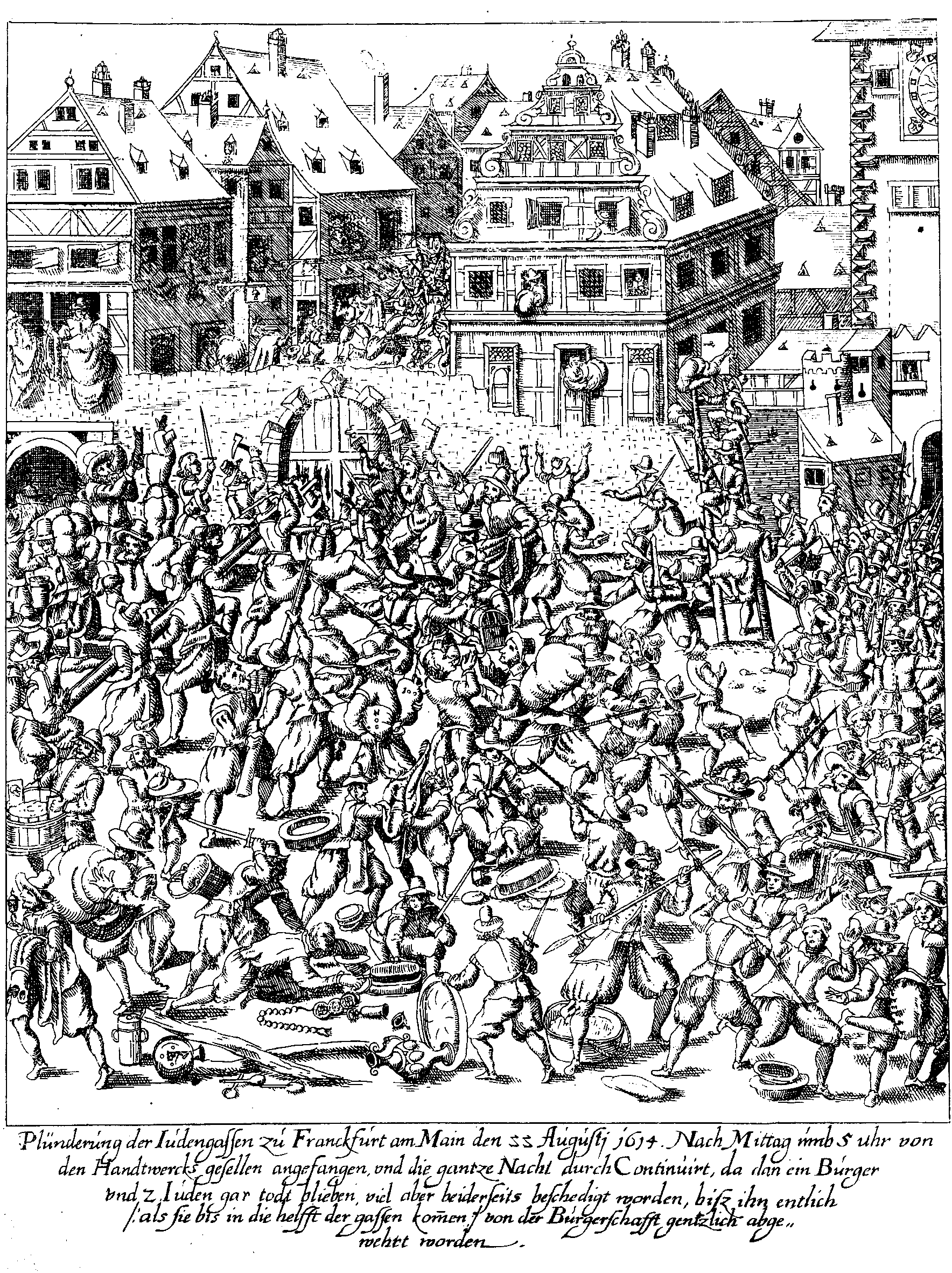
Pluenderung der Judengasse

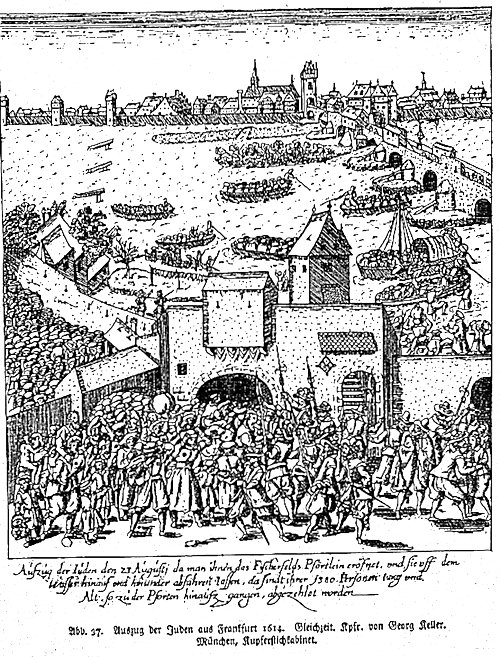
Expulsion of the Jews from Frankfurt on 23 August 1614.

Since the Council was not able to produce any evidence on the location of the 9.5 tonnes of missing gold, the radical wing of the guilds under Vincenz Fettmilch gained ground. On 5 May 1614, he had the city gates occupied by his supporters, declared the old council dissolved, and imprisoned its members in the Römer. The Senior Mayor Johann Hartmann Beyer, one of the 18 new councillors created by the citizens' contract, negotiated with the protestors and on 19 May, he signed an agreement with Fettmilch providing for the resignation of the council. However, two months later, on 26 July, an imperial herald appeared in the city, demanding the restoration of the council. When this had not happened by 22 August, the emperor threatened to place every Frankfurter under the Imperial ban, who was not prepared to swear under oath to submit to his command.

=== Pillaging the Judengasse ===
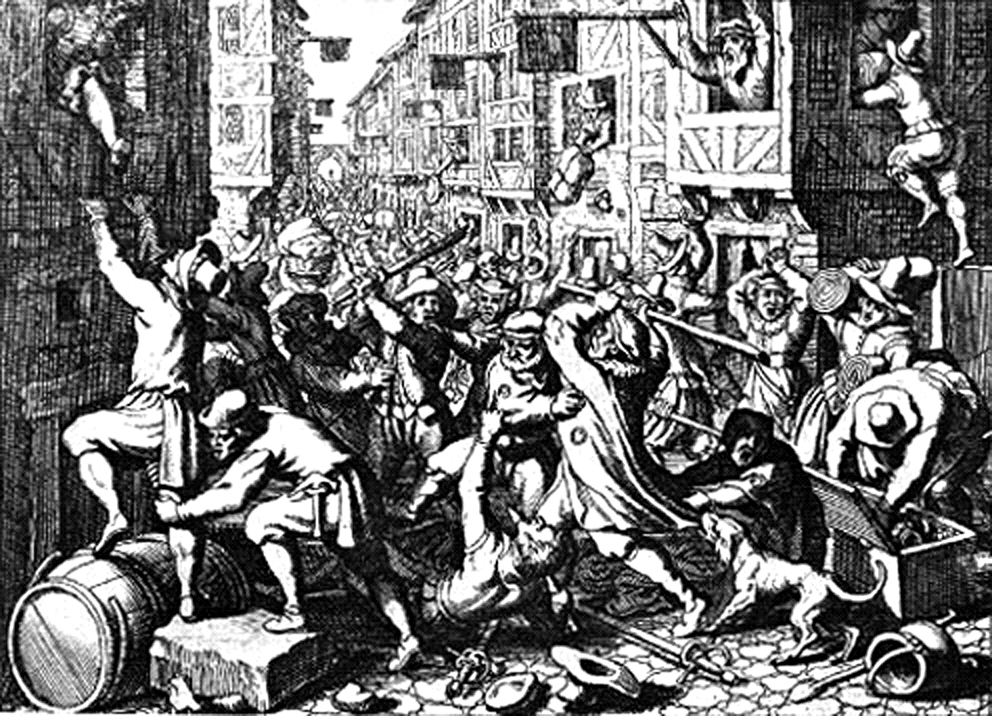
The pillaging of the Frankfurter Judengasse during the Fettmilch pogrom; print by Matthäus Merian the Elder, 1628.

The protestors, who had assumed all along that the emperor would support them, reacted with fury, directed at the weakest of their supposed enemies. On 22 August, a crowd of journeymen surged through the city shouting "give us work and bread!" Around noon, the now-drunk journeymen stormed the Frankfurt Judengasse, the walled ghetto on the east side of the town, which was accessed through three gates.

In the fighting that followed, one of the journeymen and two Jewish defenders lost their lives. The Jews eventually fled to the neighbouring cemetery or into the Christian part of the city, where many of them were hidden by friendly Frankfurt citizens. Meanwhile, the mob plundered the Judengasse, until it was finally driven out by the Frankfurt citizens' militia around midnight. The damage from this pillaging ran to around 170,000 guilders.

Vincenz Fettmilch himself does not seem to have participated in the riot. Later, at his trial, he claimed that it had happened against his will. It is possible that he had briefly lost control of his followers. However, no convincing evidence exists to support Fettmilch's attempts to disentangle himself from these riots. On the contrary, the next day, he ordered the expulsion of all Jews from Frankfurt. Most of them sought refuge in the neighbouring cities of Höchst and Hanau (in Mainz and Hesse respectively).

== The end of Fettmilch ==
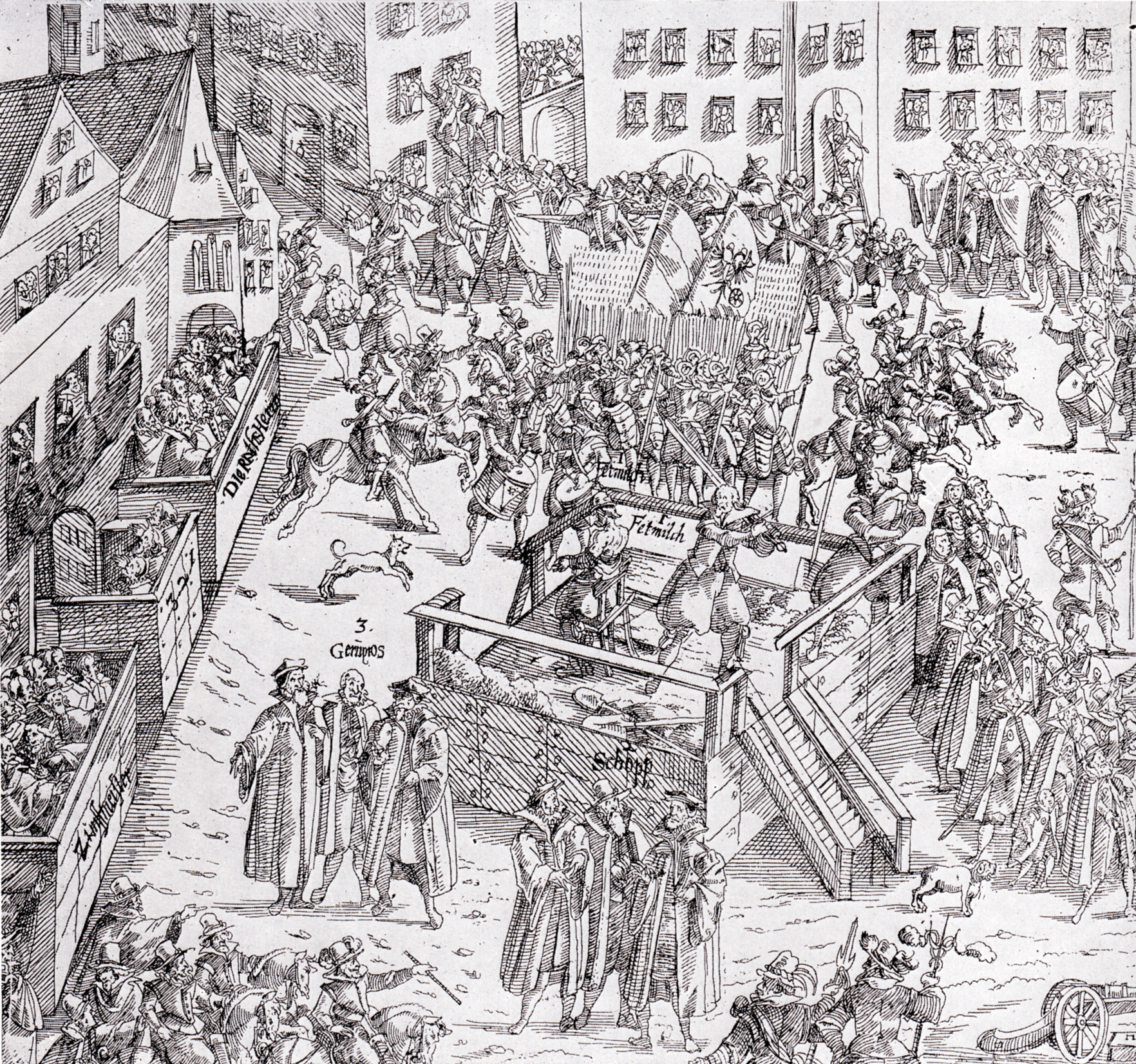
The execution of Fettmilch in Rossmarkt, 28 February 1616

These anti-semitic acts and the intertwined conflict with the emperor caused Fettmilch's prestige to rapidly drop. Ever more of his followers abandoned him. On 28 October 1614, an imperial herald announced in the Römer that the Imperial ban had been imposed on Fettmilch, and the tailors Konrad Gerngross and Konrad Schopp, as the ringleaders of the rebellion. On 27 November the judge Johann Martin Baur ordered Fettmilch's arrest. Subsequently, four more Frankfurters were placed under the ban, including the silk-dyer Georg Ebel of Sachsenhausen.

In a long trial, which extended through almost the whole of 1615, Fettmilch and thirty-eight of his associated were not prosecuted for the riots against the Jews directly, but for lèse-majesté, since they had disregarded the commands of the emperor. At least seven of them were sentenced to death, which was carried out on 28 February 1616 in the Rossmarkt. Before the beheading, their oath fingers were cut off. Fettmilch was also quartered after his execution. The heads of Fettmilch, Gerngross, Schopp, and Ebel were displayed on pikes on the towers of the Alte Brücke, where they remained until at least the time of Goethe, who mentions them in his autobiography Dichtung und Wahrheit.

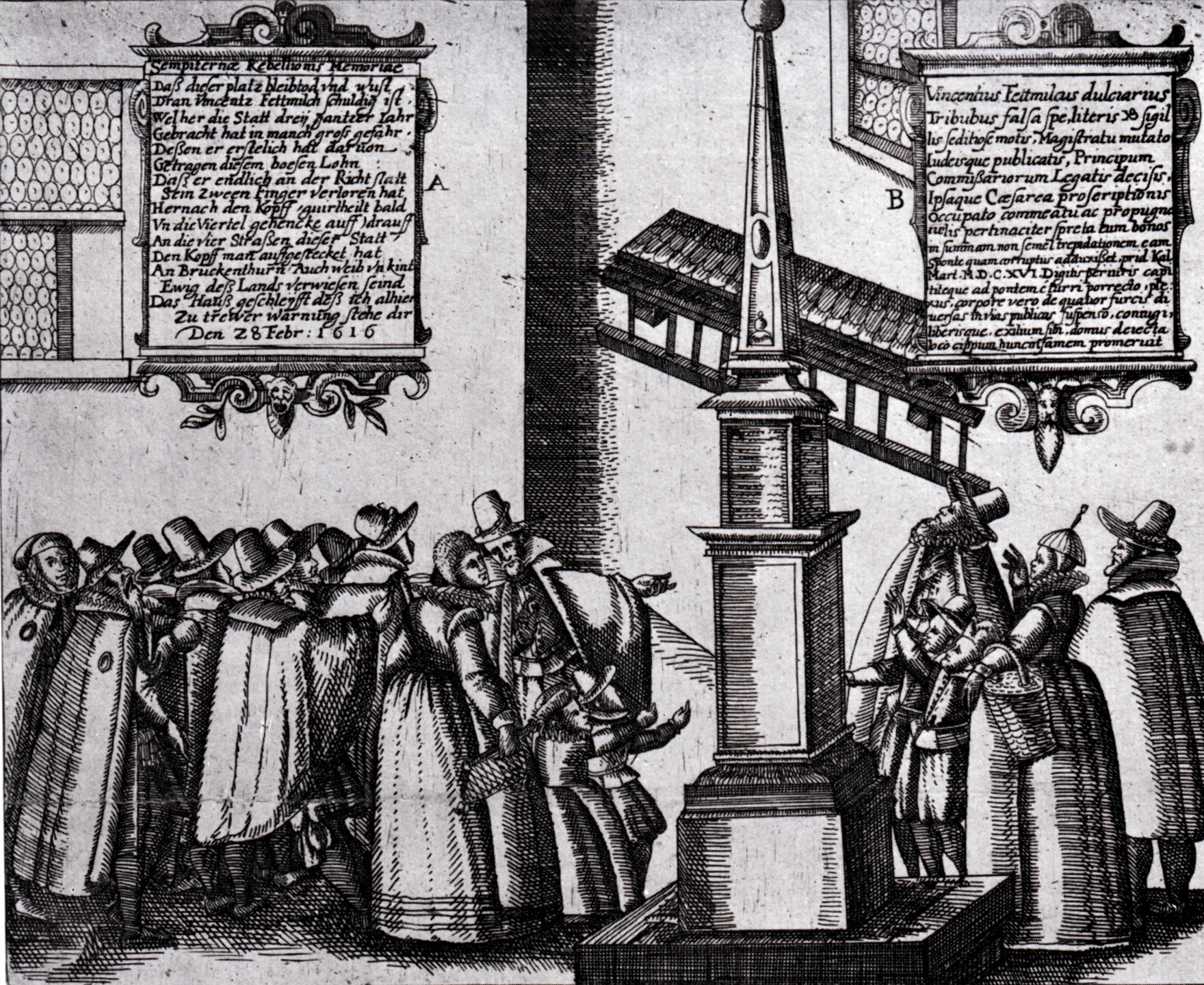
The pillar of shame erected at the site of Fettmilch's house on Töngesgasse.

Among the ancient remains, the skull of a civic criminal mounted of the bridge's tower had been noteworthy to me from childhood onwards. It was one of three or four, as the empty iron pikes showed, that had survived all the rigours of time and weather since 1616. Whenever you returned from Sachsenhaus to Frankfurt, the tower was in front of you, and the skull caught the eye.

— Johann Wolfgang Goethe, Aus meinem Leben. Dichtung und Wahrheit. Part 1, book 4

Fettmilch's house on the Töngesgasse was torn down and a pillar of shame was erected on the spot on which inscribed his crimes in Latin and a rhyming poem about the rebellion in German.

After the executions, which included an extensive reading of verdicts and lasted several hours, an imperial mandate was proclaimed, which ordered the restoration of the Jews expelled in August 1614, with their old rights and privileges. Later the same day, the Jews who had been in Höchst and Hanau since the expulsion, returned to the Judengasse in a festive procession. An Imperial eagle was placed on the gate to the Judengasse with the inscription "Roman Imperial Majesty and the Holy Empire's Protection."

== Aftermath ==
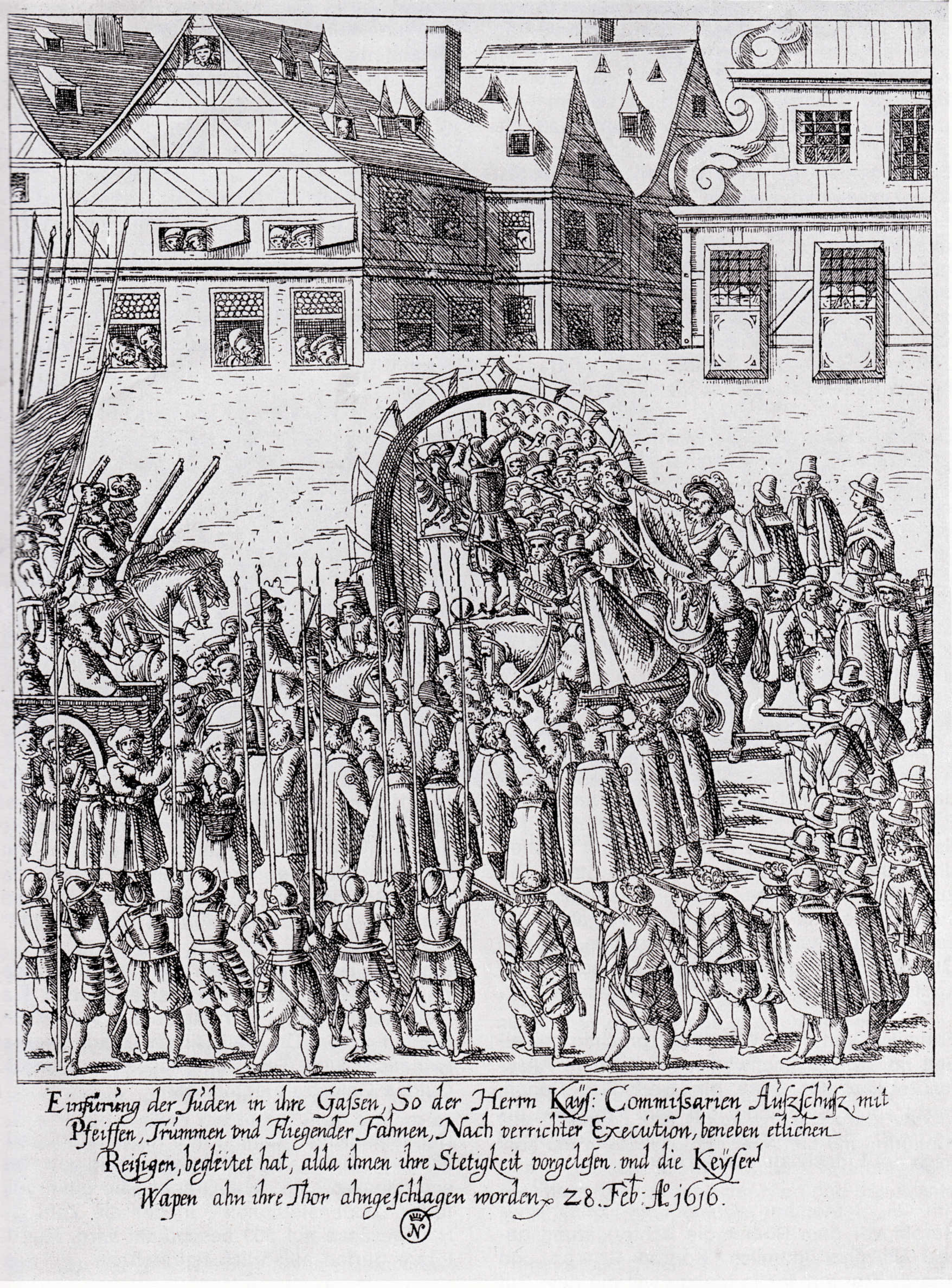
The return of the Jews to Frankfurt, 1616

With Imperial support, the old council controlled by the Alten Limpurg society largely pushed through its goals. The number of councillors from the society was limited to fourteen, but all complaints of the citizenry against the old council were denied. The balance of power in the council shifted slightly in favour of merchants from the Zum Frauenstein society.

While the commercial element in the civic government was therefore slightly strengthened, the influence of craftsmen was curtailed even further. The guilds were required to pay a fine of 100,000 guilders to the emperor and were dissolved. Supervision of trades henceforth rested with the council itself. Nine Frankfurt citizens who participated in the riots were permanently exiled from the city, another 23 were exiled for a limited period of time. More than 2,000 citizens had to pay fines.

It was more than a century before the Frankfurt citizens peacefully regained the privileges which they had lost as a result of the Fettmilch uprising. With the support of the emperor, the nine-man audit committee was reintroduced in 1726, which ended the worst abuses of the patrician government through control of the finances.

The Jews were meant to be compensated for all property damage from the city treasury, but they never actually received the money. Although they were the victims of the uprising, the old restrictions on their rights were largely retained. The new Judenstättigkeit for Frankfurt, which was issued by the Imperial commissioners from Hesse and Mainz, specified that the number of Jewish families in Frankfurt should be limited to five hundred. Only twelve Jewish couples were allowed to marry each year, while Christians only had to prove to the civic administration that they had sufficient assets in order to get a marriage license. The Jews' economic rights were broadly equivalent to those of Christian non-citizen residents, since they could not operate shops, engage in small-scale commerce, establish commercial partnerships with citizens, or own land. These limitations all had roots deep in the Middle Ages. A new feature of the new Judenstättigkeit was that Jews were now explicitly permitted to engage in wholesaling, although they were sometimes required to have sureties as with grain, wine, spices, and long-distance trade in cloth, silk, and other textiles. It is possible that the emperor expanded the economic power of the Jews in this way so that they could act as a counter-weight to the Christian merchant families, which the abolition of the guilds had left in charge of Frankfurt. The Judengasse ghetto endured until Napoleonic times.

The anniversary of the triumphant Jewish return to Frankfurt is commemorated annually by the Jewish community in the festival of Purim Vinz on 20 Adar in the Jewish calendar. The name of the festival is derived from Fettmilch's first name, Vinzenz. A celebratory song, Megillat Vintz or Vinz-Hans-Lief was published by Elchanan Bar Abraham in 1648 and continued to be sung at the Purim Vinz festival into the 20th century. It has four verses, whose lyrics exist in Hebrew, Yiddish, and German versions. The melody is that of the German marching song, Die Schlacht von Pavia. The song is an important source for the events of the uprising.

== Bibliography ==
Contemporary sources

- Joseph Hahn (Yuspa): Josif Ometz. Frankfurt am Main (Hahn wrote a chronicle of the Frankfurt Jewish community up to the time of the pogrom.
- Nahmann Puch: [no title] Frankfurt am Main or Hanau 1616. Ed. Bobzin, Hermann Süß: Sammlung Wagenseil, Harald Fischer Verlag, Erlangen 1996, ISBN 3-89131-227-X (a Yiddish song about the pogrom and its consequences for the Jewish community).
- Horst Karasek: Der Fedtmilch-Aufstand oder wie die Frankfurter 1612/14 ihrem Rat einheizten (= Wagenbachs Taschenbücherei, Band 58), Wagenbach, Berlin 1979, ISBN 3-8031-2058-6.

Modern scholarship

- Benz, Wolfgang; Mihok, Brigitte (2011). Ereignisse, Dekrete, Kontroversen (in German). Walter de Gruyter. pp. 132–134. ISBN 978-3-11-025514-0.
- Bothe, Friedrich; Cunitz, Olaf; Ermel, Jan; Graf, Michael (1920). Frankfurts wirtschaftlich-soziale Entwicklung vor dem Dreissigjährigen Kriege und der Fettmilchaufstand (1612–1616): Teil II.: Statistische Bearbeitungen und urkundliche Belege (in German). J. Baer.
- Brandt, Robert (1996). Der Fettmilch-Aufstand: Bürgerunruhen und Judenfeindschaft in Frankfurt am Main 1612–1616 (in German). Historisches Museum. DNB-IDN 953714098 (Catalogue for an exhibition of the Historisches Museum Frankfurt).
- Friedrichs, Christopher R. (1986). "Politics or Pogrom? The Fettmilch Uprising in German and Jewish History". Central European History. 19 (2). Cambridge: Cambridge University Press: 186–228. doi:10.1017/S0008938900019427. ISSN 0008-9389.
- Huth, Markus (2009). Der Frankfurter 'Fettmilchaufstand': Untersuchungen zu den Frankfurter Unruhen 1612–1616 (in German). GRIN Verlag. ISBN 978-3-640-34512-0.
- Koch, Rainer (1997). "1612–1616. Der Fettmilchaufstand. Sozialer Sprengstoff in der Bürgerschaft". Archiv für Frankfurts Geschichte und Kunst. 63. Frankfurt: Verlag Waldemar Kramer: 59–79. ISSN 0341-8324.
- Kracauer, Isidor. "Die Juden Frankfurts im Fettmilch'schen Aufstand 1612–1618". Zeitschrift für die Geschichte der Juden in Deutschland. 1890 & 1892. Braunschweig: 127–169, 319–365, 1–26.
- Meyn, Matthias (1980). Die Reichsstadt Frankfurt vor dem Bürgeraufstand von 1612 bis 1614: Struktur und Krise (in German). Kramer. ISBN 978-3-7829-0235-9.
- Rolfes, Jutta (1997). "'Die Juden in der Reichsstadt Frankfurt am Main zur Zeit des Fettmilch-Aufstandes 1612–1616". Archiv für Frankfurts Geschichte und Kunst. 63. Frankfurt am Main: Verlag Waldemar Kramer: 223–237. ISSN 0341-8324.
- Stern, Heidi (2009). Noor, Ashraf (ed.). "Die Vertreibung der Frankfurter und Wormser Juden im frühen 17. Jahrhundert aus der Sicht des Zeitzeugen Nahman Puch. Edition und Kommentar eines jiddischen Lieds". Naharaim. 3 (1). Berlin, New York: De Gruyter: 1–53. doi:10.1515/naha.2009.002.
- Ulmer, Rivka (2001). Turmoil, trauma, and triumph: the Fettmilch uprising in Frankfurt am Main (1612–1616) according to Megillas Vintz a critical edition of the Yiddish and Hebrew text including an English translation. Frankfurt am Main Berlin Bern: P. Lang. ISBN 3-631-36957-3.
- Turniansky, Chava (2000). "The Events in Frankfurt am Main (1612–1616) in Megillas Vints and in an Unknown Yiddish 'Historical' Song". In Graetz, Michael (ed.). Schöpferische Momente des europäischen Judentums in der frühen Neuzeit (in German). Heidelberg: Universitätsverlag C. Winter. pp. 121–137. ISBN 978-3-8253-1053-0.

== Adaptations ==
- Revolution in Frankfurt, TV documentary, BR Deutschland 1979, book: Heinrich Leippe, director: Fritz Umgelter, with Günter Strack, Joost Siedhoff, Richard Münch et al.
- Astrid Keim, Das verschwundene Gold, Acabus 2021 (historical novel)
