= Patriciate of Frankfurt am Main =

The Patriciate (German: Patriziat) was the group of noble families who controlled Frankfurt am Main from the High Middle Ages until the end of the Free City of Frankfurt in 1806. It consisted of a set of families who belonged to one of two patrician societies, called Alten Limpurg and Zum Frauenstein.

== History ==
In 1220, Emperor Frederick II abolished the advocatus of Frankfurt. From that point, the citizen community began to aggregate rights of self-government and privileges. From 1266, a council (German: Rat) represented the Frankfurt citizenry. It consisted of three "benches" of fourteen men each. The first bench consisted of "lay judges" Schöffen, who represented the patrician families and were coopted onto the council based on seniority. The second bench were also patricians, drawn from the "community", while the third bench were artisans drawn from the "council-status guilds." The emperor could appoint a Schultheiß ("right-speaker") who was to protect the emperor's prerogatives and was initially the supreme authority in the city.

From 1311, the Council elected two mayors by secret ballot: the "senior mayor" (German: Älteren Bürgermeister) from the first bench and the "junior mayor" (German: Jüngeren Bürgermeister) from the second bench. In May 1372, Frankfurt purchased the office of the Schultheiß from Emperor Charles IV and finally became a free imperial city.

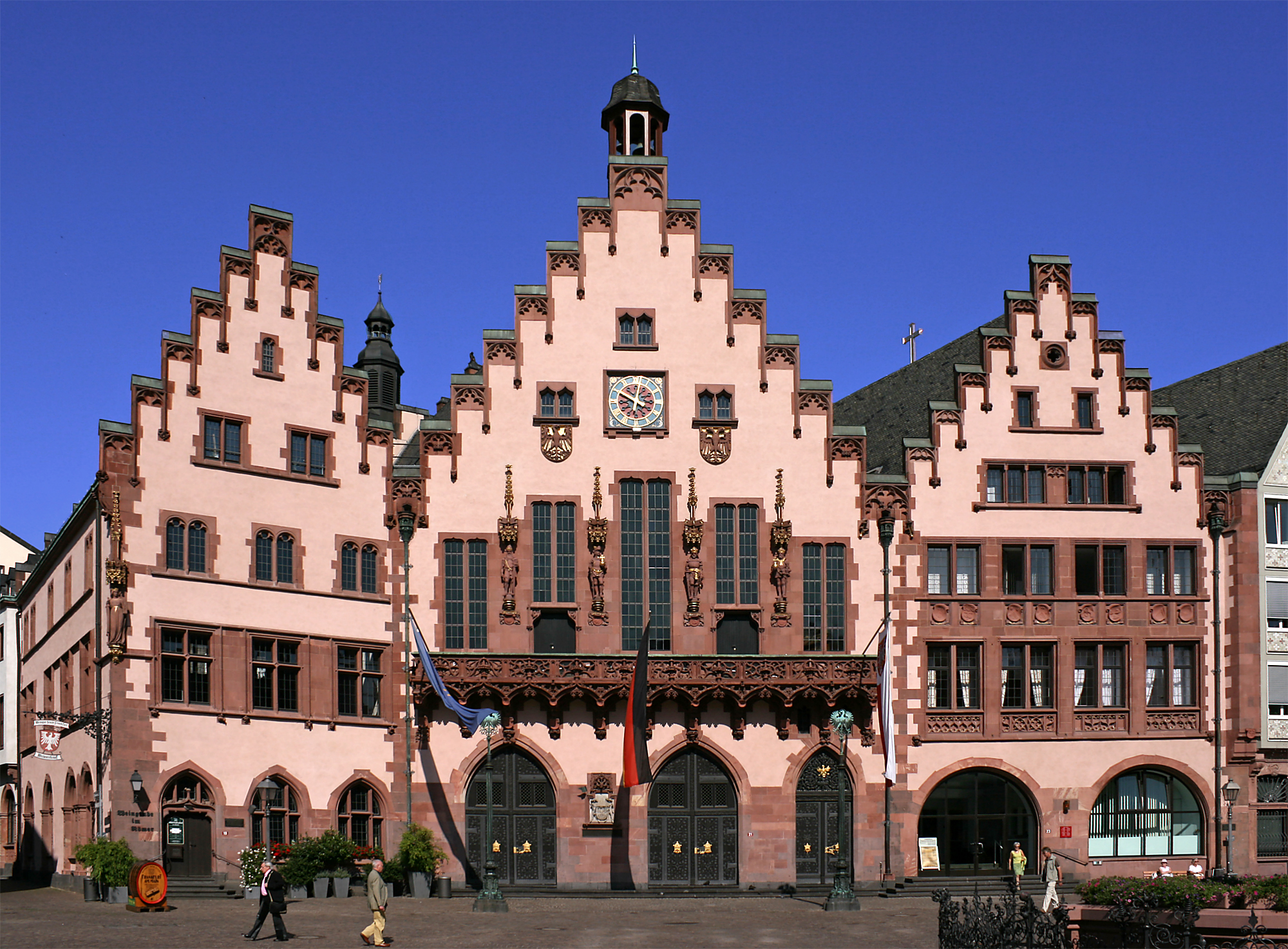
The Römer, Frankfurt's town hall since 1405. At left, the house of the Alten Limpurg society; in the centre, the Römer proper; at right, the house of Löwenstein

Most of the old Frankfurt families banded together in the patrician society of Alten Limpurg, which went back the Zum Römer drinking society, founded in 1357. There were other noble families who did not belong to Alten Limpurg. They were mostly members of the Zum Frauenstein society, which derived from another drinking club, Zum Salzhaus, which was founded in 1382. Zum Frauenstein was slightly more liberal and admitted foreigners. As a result, the "nouveau riche" only had a chance at rising to political power through the Zum Frauenstein society.

Until the end of the free city in 1806, Alten Limpurg and Zum Frauenstein had great influence over the city council, while the guild masters lost most of their power over time. Initially, most seats on the council were reserved for members of Alten Limpurg, but, during the Fettmilch uprising in 1613, it was agreed that members of Zum Frauenstein and legal graduates would also be taken into account in the selection of members of the first two benches of the council, after which there was a kind of equality in the civic government between Alten Limburg and Zum Frauenstein.

The historian Andrea Hansert divides the patriciate in the 17th century into three clearly delineated groups, which he calls the "first" (Alten Limpurg), "second" (Zum Frauenstein") and "third" patriciates. Hansert's third group contained the citizen families outside the two societies who tended to dominate the "non-patriciate" council seats. This last category included the Textor family, the maternal ancestors of Goethe.

=== Abolition ===
The patriciate was abolished with the end of the free city in 1806, when Frankfurt became part of the State of the Prince-primate and then, in 1806, the Grand Duchy of Frankfurt. After French rule ended in 1813, Frankfurt became a free city once more, passing a constitution in 1816. The patriciate was not revived. After that, the families in Alten Limpurg and Zum Frauenstein lost almost all the rights of nobility, which were once connected with an augmentation of honour.

The Zum Frauenstein society still exists. It administrates the Dr. Beyer Foundation, among other things. Frauensteinplatz and Frauensteinstrasse in Nordend are named after it. Alten Limpurg survives as a legal entity called the "noble inheritance of the house" (German: Adelige Ganerbschaft des Hauses).

== Families ==
Alten Limpurg families

A genealogical database of the Frankfurt patriciate names around 198 families of Alten Limpurg, of which the following were in existence before the end of the free city in 1806:

- Adlerflycht, admitted to the patriciate in 1755, died out in 1835
- Altzey, admitted to the patriciate in 1453, died out in 1524
- Appenheimer, admitted to the patriciate in 1406, died out in 1450
- Baur von Eysseneck (Bauer), admitted to Alten Limpurg 1622 with Johann Martin Baur von Eysseneck, died out in 1945
- Becker, admitted to the patriciate in 1440, died out in 1476
- v. Bellersheim named Stürzelsheim, admitted to the patriciate in 1801, died out in 1984
- Blanckenberger, admitted to the patriciate in 1415, died out in 1450
- Blum, admitted to the patriciate in 1476, died out in 1515
- Boltog, admitted to the patriciate in 1795, died out in 1955
- Börlin, admitted to the patriciate in 1467, died out in 1485
- Botzheim, admitted to the patriciate in 1566, died out in 1573
- Breidenbach, admitted to the patriciate in 1406, died out in 1493
- Bromm, admitted to the patriciate in 1477, died out in 1680
- Brun zum Brunfels, admitted to the patriciate in 1406, died out in 1589
- Burckhard, admitted to the patriciate in 1555, died out in 1573
- Burggrafen, admitted to the patriciate in 1408, died out in 1453
- Caldenburg, admitted to the patriciate in 1425, died out in 1489
- Cämmerer von Fulda, admitted to the patriciate in 1466, died out in 1497
- Dähn, admitted to the patriciate in 1568, died out in 1572
- Damm, admitted to the patriciate in 1661, died out in 1735
- Degenhard, admitted to the patriciate in 1575, died out in 1652
- Diermayer (Tiermayer), admitted to the patriciate in 1478, died out in 1480
- Diether, admitted to the patriciate in 1641, died out in 1656
- Dörnberg, admitted to the patriciate in 1801, died out in 1897
- Eck I, admitted to the patriciate in 1471, died out in 1492
- Eckel, admitted to the patriciate in 1514, died out in 1525
- Eisenberger (Eyssenberg), admitted to the patriciate in 1485, died out in 1599
- Engelbrecht, admitted to the patriciate in 1561, died out in 1577
- Ergersheim, admitted to the patriciate in 1406, died out in 1494
- Faust von Aschaffenburg, admitted to the patriciate in 1561, died out in 1724
- Faut von Monsperg (Fauthen von Monsperg), admitted to the patriciate in 1490, died out in 1516
- (v.) Fichard, admitted to the patriciate in 1539, died out in 1945
- Fladt, admitted to the patriciate in 1549, died out in 1605
- Fleckhammer v. Aystetten, admitted to the patriciate in 1636, died out in 1727
- Fleischbein (Fleischbein von Kleeberg), admitted to Alten Limpurg 1755, died out in 1774
- Freitag, admitted to the patriciate in 1407, died out in 1440
- Freund, admitted to the patriciate in 1513, died out in 1515
- Frosch, admitted to the patriciate in 1406, died out in 1584
- Fürstenberg, admitted to the patriciate in 1474, died out in 1540
- Gantz, admitted to the patriciate in 1463, died out in 1485
- Gerolstein, admitted to the patriciate in 1538, died out in 1549
- Geuch, admitted to the patriciate in 1464, died out in 1522
- von Glauburg, admitted to the patriciate in 1406, died out in 1830
- Goldstein, admitted to the patriciate in 1406, died out in 1428
- Grünberger (Grünberg), admitted to the patriciate in 1517, died out in 1530
- Günderrode, admitted to the patriciate in 1588, died out in 1980
- Harheim, admitted to the patriciate in 1406, died out in 1434
- Hartmuth v. Birkenbach, admitted to the patriciate in 1544, died out in 1554
- Hartrad (auch Hartrad von Dieburg), admitted to the patriciate in 1357, died out in 1432
- Hayne (Haane), admitted to the patriciate in 1433, died out in 1504
- Hell gen. Pfeffer, admitted to the patriciate in 1495, died out in 1536
- Heller, admitted to the patriciate in 1486, died out in 1502
- Hengsperg, admitted to the patriciate in 1443, died out in 1487
- Heringen, admitted to the patriciate in 1439, died out in 1492
- Heusenstamm, admitted to the patriciate in 1495, died out in 1525
- Hohenhaus (zum Hohenhaus), admitted to the patriciate in 1406, died out in 1420
- Hohenstein, admitted to the patriciate in 1747, died out in 1792
- Holtzheimer, admitted to the patriciate in 1406, died out in 1510
- von Holzhausen, admitted to the patriciate in 1406; the Frankfurt branch of the family ended with the death of Adolph von Holzhausen in 1923.
- von Humbracht, admitted to the patriciate in 1427, died out in 1896 with the death of Hermann von Humbracht (from 1883 Freiherr von Humbracht)
- Humbrecht (zum Humbrecht), admitted to the patriciate in 1406, died out in 1477
- Hynsperg, admitted to the patriciate in 1430, died out in 1727
- Imhof, admitted to the patriciate in 1406, died out in 1431
- Inckus zu Schwanau, admitted to the patriciate in 1406, died out in 1473
- Jeckel, admitted to the patriciate in 1531, died out in 1639
- Joham von Mündolsheim, admitted to the patriciate in 1566, died out in 1588
- [[|Jungen]] (zum Jungen), admitted to the patriciate in 1430, died out with Austrian field marshal Johann Hieronymus zum Jungen in 1746
- Katzmann, admitted to the patriciate in 1435, died out in 1483
- Katzmann II, admitted to the patriciate in 1553, died out in 1566
- Kayb, admitted to the patriciate in 1636, died out in 1760
- Kellner (Keller), admitted to the patriciate in 1518, died out in 1777
- Kellner gen. Kaldofen, admitted to the patriciate in 1495, died out in 1510
- Kempe, admitted to the patriciate in 1406, died out in 1430
- Kessling von Bergen, admitted to the patriciate in 1804, died out in 1808
- Ketelhodt, admitted to the patriciate in 1798, died out in 1887
- Knoblauch, admitted to the patriciate in 1406, died out in 1599
- Kranche (zum Kranche), admitted to the patriciate in 1406, died out in 1418
- Kühorn, admitted to the patriciate in 1501, died out in 1599
- Lamb (zum Lamb), admitted to the patriciate in 1543, died out in 1559
- Landeck, admitted to the patriciate in 1430, died out in 1500
- Leneck (Linung), admitted to the patriciate in 1482, died out in 1572
- von Lersner, admitted to the patriciate in 1566, blühend, seit 1881 Freiherren von Lersner
- Lichtenstein, admitted to the patriciate in 1406, died out in 1498
- Marburg (zum Paradies), admitted to the patriciate in 1406, died out in 1502
- Martorff, admitted to the patriciate in 1467, died out in 1614
- Melem, admitted to Alten Limperg 1522, died out in 1654
- Mengershausen, admitted to the patriciate in 1548, died out in 1632
- Molsberg, admitted to the patriciate in 1513, died out in 1541
- Monis, admitted to the patriciate in 1441, died out in 1504
- Mühlen, admitted to the patriciate in 1733, still extant
- Mynner, admitted to the patriciate in 1406, died out in 1463
- Nebenzayl, admitted to the patriciate in 1471, died out in 1480
- Neuhaus, admitted to the patriciate in 1459, died out in 1666
- Nygebur, admitted to the patriciate in 1406, died out in 1452
- Ockstadt, admitted to the patriciate in 1406, died out in 1443
- Oede (von der Oede), admitted to the patriciate in 1406, died out in 1450
- Ovenbach, admitted to the patriciate in 1406, died out in 1478
- Palmstorfer, admitted to the patriciate in 1430, died out in 1484
- Pistorius v. Nidda, admitted to the patriciate in 1619, died out in 1639
- Preme, admitted to the patriciate in 1590, died out in 1622
- Preuß (Prüsse, Prusse), admitted to the patriciate in 1421, died out in 1468
- Raiss (Rais), admitted to the patriciate in 1459, 1473 and 1477, died out in 1589
- Rauscher, admitted to the patriciate in 1543, died out in 1596
- Reiffenstein, admitted to the patriciate in 1518, died out in 1551
- Rhein (vom Rhein), admitted to the patriciate in 1411, died out in 1577
- Römer (zum Römer gen. Cöllner), admitted to the patriciate in 1406, died out in 1436
- Rorbach (Rohrbach), admitted to the patriciate in 1466, died out in 1570
- Rotzmaul, admitted to the patriciate in 1406, died out in 1418
- Rücker, admitted to the patriciate in 1517, died out in 1659
- Rückersfeld, admitted to the patriciate in 1575, died out in 1591
- Rückingen, admitted to the patriciate in 1473, died out in 1521
- Ruenner, admitted to the patriciate in 1440, died out in 1514
- Ruland, admitted to the patriciate in 1675, died out in 1743
- Rumpenheim, admitted to the patriciate in 1489, died out in 1557
- Sachs (Sassen), admitted to the patriciate in 1471, died out in 1510
- Sack, admitted to the patriciate in 1802, died out in 1816
- Schad v. Mittelbiberach, admitted to the patriciate in 1603, died out in 1737
- Scheid, admitted to the patriciate in 1489, died out in 1572
- Schildknecht, admitted to the patriciate in 1406, died out in 1480
- Schmidt (Schmyt), admitted to the patriciate in 1474, died out in 1532
- Schnabel (Snabel), admitted to the patriciate in 1438, died out in 1470
- Schönwetter v. Heymbach, admitted to the patriciate in 1489, died out in 1519
- Schrendeisen, admitted to the patriciate in 1575, died out in 1598
- Schwarzenberg, admitted to the patriciate in 1411, died out in 1516
- Selbold, admitted to the patriciate in 1412, died out in 1439
- Siegwein, admitted to the patriciate in 1463, died out in 1514
- Silberborner, admitted to the patriciate in 1461, died out in 1562
- Sorgenloch gen. Gensfleisch, admitted to the patriciate in 1522, died out in 1550
- Sossenheimer (Sossenheim), admitted to the patriciate in 1494, died out in 1506
- Speyer, admitted to the patriciate in 1411, died out in 1479
- Stalburg (Stalberg, Stalberger), admitted to the patriciate in 1468, died out in 1824
- Staud, admitted to the patriciate in 1563, died out in 1570
- Steffan von Cronstetten (Stephanshenn), admitted to the patriciate in 1505, died out in 1766
- Steinhaus (im Steinhaus), admitted to the patriciate in 1421, died out in 1468
- Stetten, admitted to the patriciate in 1596, died out in 1733
- Stralenberg, admitted to the patriciate in 1406, died out in 1636
- Stumpf v. Dettingen, admitted to the patriciate in 1486, died out in 1552
- Sundhausen, admitted to the patriciate in 1517, died out in 1550
- Syvertes, admitted to the patriciate in 1733, died out in 1748
- Uffsteiner, admitted to the patriciate in 1495, died out in 1669
- Völker, admitted to the patriciate in 1447, died out in 1761
- Wachendorf, admitted to the patriciate in 1470, died out in 1483
- Walther v. Herborn, admitted to the patriciate in 1608, died out in 1627
- Weiß v. Limpurg, admitted to the patriciate in 1406, died out in 1656
- Wernher, admitted to the patriciate in 1524, died out in 1535
- Wetter, admitted to the patriciate in 1505, died out in 1516
- Wiedtmann, admitted to the patriciate in 1571, died out in 1575
- Winden, admitted to the patriciate in 1406, died out in 1420
- Wolff I, admitted to the patriciate in 1507, died out in 1534
- Wunderer, admitted to the patriciate in 1613, died out in 1794
- Ysseneck, admitted to the patriciate in 1471, died out in 1509
- Zedtwitz, admitted to the patriciate in 1544, died out in 1554
- v. Ziegesar, admitted to the patriciate in 1774, died out in 1901
- Zingel, admitted to the patriciate in 1406, died out in 1444

Zum Frauenstein families

A genealogical database of the Frankfurt patriciate names a total of 223 families in Zum Frauenstein, of which the following were the most significant families up to the end of the free city in 1806:

- Aa gen. Wackerwald (only representative was Johann Aa gen. Wackerwald), admitted to the patriciate in 1469, died out before 1479
- Adelheuser, admitted to the patriciate in 1613, died out in 1634
- Assenheimer, admitted to the patriciate in 1494, died out in 1510
- Bär zum Bären, admitted to the patriciate in 1520, died out in 1539
- Barckhaus (Barckhausen), admitted to the patriciate in 1683, died out in 1815 (see also Wiesenhütten)
- Baur von Eysseneck (Bauer), admitted to the patriciate in 1613, transferred to Alten Limpurg in 1622
- Bebinger, admitted to the patriciate in 1584, died out in 1646
- Becht, admitted to the patriciate in 1600, died out in 1641
- Bencker I, admitted to the patriciate in 1494, died out in 1521
- Bender von Bienenthal, admitted to the patriciate in 1669, died out in 1835
- Beyer I, admitted to the patriciate in 1494, died out in 1511
- Beyer II, admitted to the patriciate in 1613, died out in 1625
- Blum, admitted to the patriciate in 1430, died out in 1492
- Bocher, admitted to the patriciate in 1532, died out in 1562
- Braumann, admitted to the patriciate in 1557, died out in 1664
- Braun, admitted to the patriciate in 1556, died out in 1704
- Bromm, admitted to the patriciate in 1439, died out in 1457
- Bruder, admitted to the patriciate in 1659, died out in 1677
- Clemm, admitted to the patriciate in 1692, died out in 1719
- Cless, admitted to the patriciate in 1636, died out in 1676
- Combder, admitted to the patriciate in 1560, died out in 1575
- Comes, admitted to the patriciate in 1439, died out in 1508
- Degen, admitted to the patriciate in 1452, died out in 1473
- Demer, admitted to the patriciate in 1483, died out in 1499
- Deublinger, admitted to the patriciate in 1578, died out in 1640
- Diermayer (Tiermayer), admitted to the patriciate in 1481, died out in 1495
- Dirmstein, admitted to the patriciate in 1405, died out in 1507
- Eberhard gen. Schwind, admitted to the patriciate in 1655, died out in 1748
- Eck I, admitted to the patriciate in 1420, died out in 1471
- Eck II, admitted to the patriciate in 1532, died out in 1540
- Eller, admitted to the patriciate in 1523, died out in 1591
- Eschborn, admitted to the patriciate in 1541, died out in 1557
- Faut von Monsperg, admitted to the patriciate in 1405, died out in 1490
- Fischer, admitted to the patriciate in 1609, died out in 1730
- Fleischbein (Fleischbein von Kleeberg), admitted to the patriciate in 1589, died out in 1824
- Freund, admitted to the patriciate in 1510, died out in 1540
- Gerlach, admitted to the patriciate in 1566, died out in 1601
- Geuch, admitted to the patriciate in 1439, died out in 1459
- Glock, admitted to the patriciate in 1677, died out in 1710
- Grambs, admitted to the patriciate in 1626, died out in 1788
- Grünberger (Grünberg), admitted to the patriciate in 1483, died out in 1538
- Hegwein, admitted to the patriciate in 1613, died out in 1632
- Heller, admitted to the patriciate in 1405, died out in 1502
- Heyden, admitted to the patriciate in 1738, died out in 1900
- Hock, admitted to the patriciate in 1609, died out in 1624
- Holzapfel, admitted to the patriciate in 1648, died out in 1663
- Horst, admitted to the patriciate in 1692, died out in 1706
- Huß, admitted to the patriciate in 1494, died out in 1510
- Inkus, admitted to the patriciate in 1443, died out in 1483
- Jeckel, admitted to the patriciate in 1500, died out in 1520
- Jostenhofer, admitted to the patriciate in 1483, died out in 1493
- Kalbach, admitted to the patriciate in 1509, died out in 1520
- Kellner (Keller), admitted to the patriciate in 1502, died out in 1516
- Kesseler, admitted to the patriciate in 1494, died out in 1515
- Kistner, admitted to the patriciate in 1611, died out in 1632
- Köhler, admitted to the patriciate in 1589, died out in 1616
- Koler, admitted to the patriciate in 1554, died out in 1613
- Köth, admitted to the patriciate in 1560, died out in 1575
- Krafft, admitted to the patriciate in 1585, died out in 1632
- Kropp, admitted to the patriciate in 1490, died out in 1503
- Lauterbach, admitted to the patriciate in 1734, died out in 1798
- Leimberger, admitted to the patriciate in 1520, died out in 1559
- Leneck (Linung), admitted to the patriciate in 1405, died out in 1457
- Leutwein, admitted to the patriciate in 1616, died out in 1641
- Loen, admitted to the patriciate in 1771, died out in 1900
- Loett, admitted to the patriciate in 1499, died out in 1509
- Lonicerus, admitted to the patriciate in 1570, died out in 1586
- Malapert gen. v. Neufville, admitted to the patriciate in 1807, died out in 1900
- May (May von Mayenstein), admitted to the patriciate in 1614, died out in 1635
- Medenbach, admitted to the patriciate in 1601, died out in 1624
- Melem, admitted to the patriciate in 1460, died out in 1531
- Mirsfeld, admitted to the patriciate in 1488, died out in 1504
- Mohr von Mohrenheim, admitted to the patriciate in 1677, ended with the death of Christian Bonaventura Mohr von Mohrenheim in 1770
- Müller I, admitted to the patriciate in 1620, died out in 1631
- Müller II, admitted to the patriciate in 1623, died out in 1636
- Müßler, admitted to the patriciate in 1517, died out in 1577
- Nees, admitted to the patriciate in 1565, died out in 1616
- Neuhaus, admitted to the patriciate in 1413, died out in 1462
- Niclas gen. Steinmetz, admitted to the patriciate in 1523, died out in 1636
- Nordeck, admitted to the patriciate in 1587, died out in 1635
- Ochs, admitted to the patriciate in 1513, died out in 1540
- Oerdinger, admitted to the patriciate in 1576, died out in 1589
- Oetinger, admitted to the patriciate in 1786, died out in 1900
- Olenschlager, admitted to the patriciate in 1771, died out in 1820
- Orth, admitted to the patriciate in 1543, died out in 1783
- Pfleger, admitted to the patriciate in 1582, died out in 1628
- Pherrer, admitted to the patriciate in 1492, died out in 1500
- Pithan, admitted to the patriciate in 1571, died out in 1608
- Pregler, admitted to the patriciate in 1513, died out in 1534
- Rauch, admitted to the patriciate in 1520, died out in 1530
- Reckmann, admitted to the patriciate in 1558, died out in 1611
- Rehm, admitted to the patriciate in 1595, died out in 1609
- Rensdorf, admitted to the patriciate in 1461, died out in 1521
- Rensfeld, admitted to the patriciate in 1592, died out in 1603
- Riese (Riese-Stallburg), admitted to the patriciate in 1788, died out in 1900
- Rorbach (Rohrbach), admitted to the patriciate in 1411, died out in 1482
- Rumpf, admitted to the patriciate in 1527, died out in 1543
- Scharpf, admitted to the patriciate in 1589, died out in 1601
- Schelm, admitted to the patriciate in 1434, died out in 1446
- Schlarff, admitted to the patriciate in 1588, died out in 1598
- Schmidt (Schmyt), admitted to the patriciate in 1443, died out in 1475
- Schnabel (Snabel), admitted to the patriciate in 1405, died out in 1417
- Schneider (Schneider gen. Schmidt), admitted to the patriciate in 1734, died out in 1835
- Schönberg, admitted to the patriciate in 1479, died out in 1486
- Schott, admitted to the patriciate in 1466, died out in 1604
- Schreck, admitted to the patriciate in 1486, died out in 1511
- Schütz, admitted to the patriciate in 1641, died out in 1654
- Schwappach, admitted to the patriciate in 1479, died out in 1490
- Schwarzenberg (Schwarzberg), admitted to the patriciate in 1579, died out in 1596
- Schwarzkopf, admitted to the patriciate in 1544, died out in 1585
- Schwind, admitted to the patriciate in 1612, died out in 1648
- Seiffart (Seiffart v. Klettenberg), admitted to the patriciate in 1635, died out in 1786
- Seuboth, admitted to the patriciate in 1574, died out in 1601
- Sossenheimer (Sossenheim), admitted to the patriciate in 1439, died out in 1493
- Sparr, admitted to the patriciate in 1616, died out in 1637
- Stahl, admitted to the patriciate in 1576, died out in 1609
- Stalburg (Stalberg, Stalberger), admitted to the patriciate in 1436, died out in 1484
- Stauff, admitted to the patriciate in 1497, died out in 1574
- Steffan von Cronstetten (Stephanshenn), admitted to the patriciate in 1465, died out in 1475
- Steg I (vom Stege), admitted to the patriciate in 1446, died out in 1467
- Steg II, admitted to the patriciate in 1510, died out in 1537
- Steinheimer, admitted to the patriciate in 1483, died out in 1613
- Steinmeyer, admitted to the patriciate in 1613, died out in 1667
- Thomas, admitted to the patriciate in 1466, died out in 1519
- Uffenbach, admitted to the patriciate in 1614, died out in 1799
- Uffsteiner, admitted to the patriciate in 1439, died out in 1658
- Ugelheimer, admitted to the patriciate in 1444, died out in 1585
- Venrade (Venrode), admitted to the patriciate in 1483, died out in 1504
- Weber, admitted to the patriciate in 1643, died out in 1673
- Weitz, admitted to the patriciate in 1630, died out in 1690
- Werlin, admitted to the patriciate in 1692, died out in 1741
- Westhofen, admitted to the patriciate in 1560, died out in 1572
- Wiesenhütten (Barckhaus gen. v. Wiesenhütten), admitted to the patriciate in 1780, died out in 1836
- Wolff I, admitted to the patriciate in 1488, died out in 1499
- Wolff II, admitted to the patriciate in 1539, died out in 1559
- Zang, admitted to the patriciate in 1680, died out in 1738
- Ziegle, admitted to the patriciate in 1511, died out in 1578
- Ziepf, admitted to the patriciate in 1527, died out in 1557

== Bibliography ==
- Frankfurt am Main (in German). Jan Thorbecke Verlag Sigmaringen. 1991. ISBN 3799541586.
- Andrea Hansert, Geburtsaristokratie in Frankfurt am Main. Geschichte des reichsstädtischen Patriziats, Wien, Köln, Weimar 2014.
- Rainer Koch, Grundlagen bürgerlicher Herrschaft. Verfassungs- und sozialgeschichtliche Studien zur bürgerlichen Gesellschaft in Frankfurt am Main (1612–1866) (= Frankfurter historische Abhandlungen. vol. 27). Steiner, Wiesbaden 1983, ISBN 3-515-03858-2 (= Frankfurt am Main, Univ., Habil.-Schr., 1981).
- Hans Körner, Frankfurter Patrizier. Historisch-Genealogisches Handbuch der Adeligen Ganerbschaft des Hauses Alten-Limpurg zu Frankfurt am Main. Vögel, München 1971.
- Franz Lerner, Die Frankfurter Patriziergesellschaft Alten-Limpurg und ihre Stiftungen. Kramer, Frankfurt am Main 1952.
