= Judah Cassuto =

Judah Cassuto (1808, Amsterdam—March 10, 1893, Hamburg) was hazzan (cantor) of the Portuguese-Jewish community of Hamburg. In 1827 he was elected chazan of the Portuguese-Jewish community, a post which he held until his death. Cassuto was not only cantor, but also spiritual chief of the congregation, and was entitled to act as rabbi at the solemnization of marriages among its members. He was a very learned man, and possessed a thorough knowledge of many modern languages. His lay occupation was that of teacher and translator. In 1843 Cassuto was appointed sworn interpreter and translator to the city of Hamburg. As a teacher he was active up to the hour of his death, which occurred suddenly. Until 1894, when a successor to Cassuto was chosen, the Portuguese congregation had no spiritual chief, marriages being solemnized by the rabbi of the German congregation.
