= Benedictus de Castro =

German-Jewish physician

- Born: c. 1597 – January 31, 1684; Hamburg, Holy Roman Empire
- Died: January 31, 1684 (aged c. 87); Hamburg, Holy Roman Empire
- Resting place: Jewish Cemetery of Altona
- Occupations: Author, physician
- Years active: 1621–1678
- Spouse: Jael
- Father: Rodrigo de Castro

Benedictus de Castro (also Benedito de Castro and Baruch Nehemias; born c. 1597 – January 31, 1684) was a physician, author, and Jewish community leader in Hamburg.

== Early life ==
De Castro was born in the late 1590s to Rodrigo de Castro, a physician, author, and a Portuguese Jewish emigrant to Hamburg who had fled in the late 16th century. In 1621, he graduated from the University of Leiden with a degree in medicine. His dissertation is considered lost. He additionally studied medicine at the University of Franeker and received a doctorate on September 3, 1624. He practiced medicine in Hamburg, and was described in his craft by Hugo Grotius as "vir humanissimus".

== Career ==
De Castro quickly became a well-respected doctor in his community. In 1645, he treated Christina, Queen of Sweden and was invited to stay in the royal palace. He is the first Jew known by name to have entered the Kingdom of Sweden. His 1647 book, Monomachia, was dedicated to her. Despite his overall success, he was attached by Christian doctors and Lutheran clergymen, among them Joachim Curtius (1585–1642). In 1631, Abraham Zacutus Lusitanus, another well-known physician, encouraged de Castro to take public action against such attacks. That year, de Castro wrote Flagellum calumniatium seu Apologia under the pseudonym Philotheo Castello. In the pamphlet, he criticized the "lies and slander" by Christian phyisicans against colleagues of Portuguese-Jewish descent where "the malicious charges against an anonymous author are refuted." In the writing, he additionally countered with many examples of the achievements of Jewish physicians in the field. It is often considered a supplement to the book Medicus Politicus, which was authored by his father, whom with he shared the ideal that doctors had a duty to heal the human soul and body so that they would be able to reflect the divine harmony of the universe as harmony among society.

In 1652, he was one of the founders of the Portuguese-Jewish community "Beth Israel", of which he was a board member from 1654 onwards, and during which he took many honorary positions. He threatened that the community would withdraw from Hamburg if they were prevented from free practice of their religion and from full schooling. In 1666, he endorsed Sabbatai Zevi. In 1678, David de Pina dedicated his thesis, De Pleuritide, to de Castro.

== Personal life ==
Due to economic struggle, he had to sell his personal library in his final years. He died in 1684 and is buried in the Jewish Cemetery of Altona. He was married to a woman named Jael.

== Works ==
- de Castro, Benedictus (1621). Disputatio medica de apoplexia (in Latin). Leiden: University of Leiden.
- Castellus, Philoteus (1631). Flagellum calumniatium seu Apologia (in Latin). Amsterdam.
- de Castro, Benedictus (1647). Benedicti à Castro Lusitani, Serenissimæ ac Potentissimæ Principis ac Dominæ Dn. Christinæ, Suecorum ... Reginæ, &c. Medici Monomachia sive Certamen Medicum: Quô verus in febre synocho putrida cum cruris inflammatione medendi usus per venæ sectionem in brachio demonstratur, præposterus autem ejus abusus per sanguinis missionem in pede, tanquam perniciosus improbatur (in Latin).
