= Vincenz Fettmilch =

German rebel leader in Frankfurt (d. 1616)

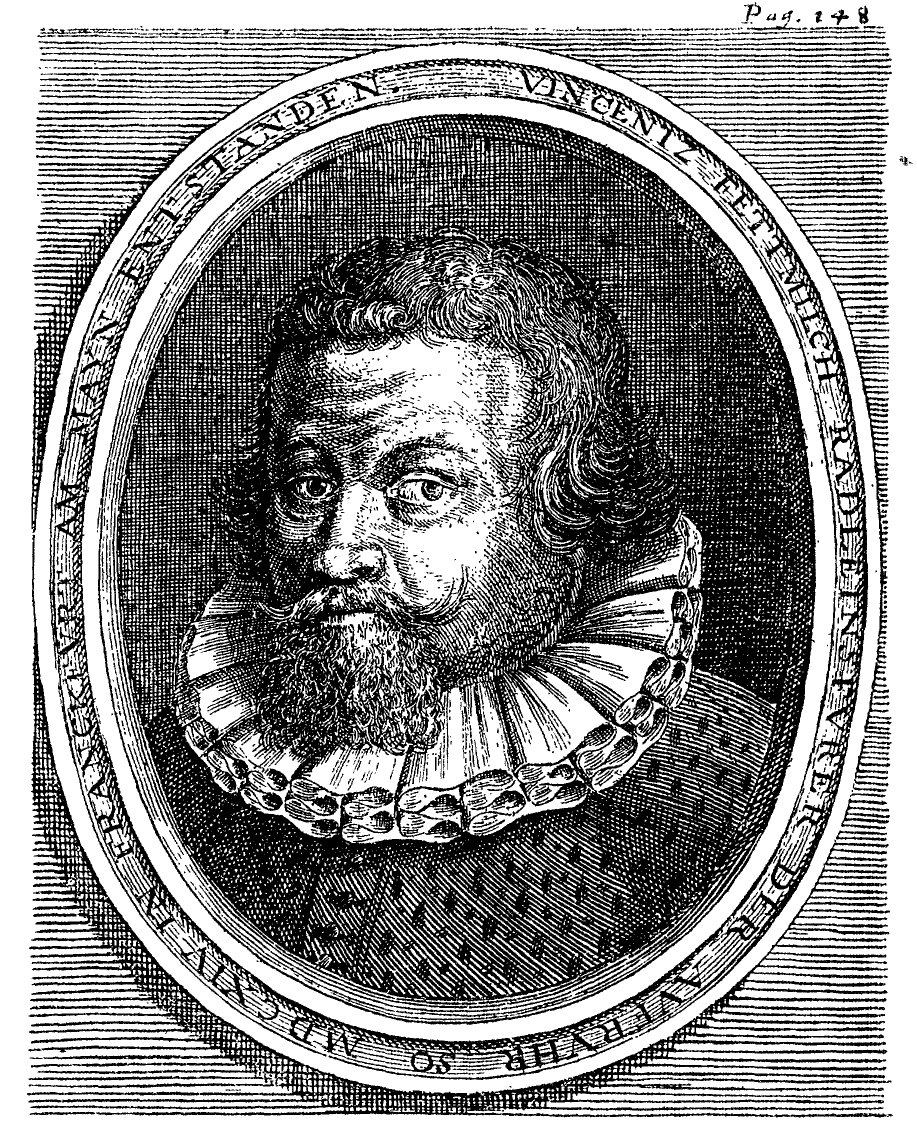
Vinzenz Fettmilch. The inscription reads: "VINCENTZ FETTMILCH RADLEINSFVRER DER AVFRVHR SO MDCXIV IN FRANCKFVRT AM MAYN ENTSTANDEN" (English: Vinzenz Fettmilch ringleader of the Fettmilch uprising of MDCXIV starting in Frankfurt am Main).

Vincenz Fettmilch (died 1616) was a grocer and gingerbread baker who led the Fettmilch uprising (1612–1616) of the guilds in Frankfurt-am-Main targeting the municipal council to determine the price of grain in an open market; disclose the special privileges of the aristocracy; and rob and expel Jews from the city whom he and his compatriots viewed as competition and usurers.

== Biography ==
Fettmilch settled in Frankfurt in 1602. On August 22, 1614, he led a mob that stormed the Judengasse ("Jews' lane") and plundered the city's 1,380 Jews. Two Jews and one assailant were killed in the pogrom. The Jews were expelled from the city until the Emperor of the Holy Roman Empire, Matthias, personally intervened. On February 28, 1616, Fettmilch and six others were executed in Frankfurt's Rossmarkt square. On the same day (20 Adar on the Hebrew calendar), the exiled Jews were led back into Frankfurt by imperial soldiers. Above the gates to the Judengasse, a stone imperial eagle was mounted bearing an inscription reading: "Protected by the Roman Imperial Majesty and the Holy Empire." The first act of the returning Jews was returning the desecrated synagogue and devastated cemetery to religious use. The anniversary of the return was celebrated yearly thereafter as the "Purim Vinz"; the Purim Kaddisch featured a merry march to commemorate the joyful return. After this, pogroms became less common in Germany until the Hep-Hep riots of 1819.
