= De Castro family =

Family

Castro
- Origin: Portugal, Spain
- Distinctions: "de Castro"

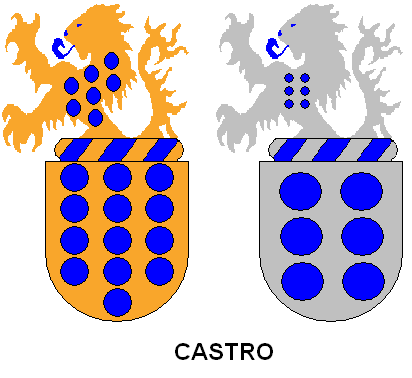
Castro family coat of arms (Portugal).

The surname Castro is used by a Sephardic Jewish family of Portuguese, Spanish and Italian origin. Soon after the establishment of the Portuguese Inquisition, members of the family emigrated to Bordeaux, Bayonne, Hamburg, and various cities in the Netherlands. Their descendants were later found scattered throughout Turkey, Egypt, Holland, Germany, England, Italy, United States and Madras.

Some branches of the family have continued to bear the simple name of de Castro whereas others are known by de Castro-Osório, de Castro Sarmento, de Castro-Castello-Osório, Pereira de Castro, de Castro Vieira de Pinto, Rodrigues de Castro, Orobio de Castro, de Castro de Paz, Henriques de Castro, etc. The name often appears as "de Crasto". The name Castro is not in origin Jewish but an Iberian Christian name, adopted by some Portuguese and Spanish Jews after the forced conversions of the late 15th and early 16th centuries. Also in Barranquilla, Santa Marta, Tuluá Valle del Cauca in Colombia and Coro in Venezuela.

== Notable members ==
- Abraham de Castro, Ottoman financier
- Benedictus de Castro, German physician
- Glaiza de Castro, Filipino actress and singer
- Isaac Orobio de Castro, Portuguese physician
- Kat de Castro, Filipino journalist and former television personality,
- Noli de Castro, Vice President of the Philippines
- Rodrigo de Castro, Portuguese physician
- Samuel de Castro was Founder of de Castro Trading house in Madras.
- Don Manuel de Castro, Spanish abaca trader, shipyard owner, and first gobernadorcillo of Magallanes, Sorsogon.
- Alvin de Castro, Australian-Filipino dancer, choreographer and designer; 2002 National Youth Week DesignIT winner and founder/director of Beatphonik, winners of the 2007 Battlegrounds National Championship and 2008 Australian Hip Hop Championships.

== See also ==
- Inquisition
- Marranos
- Crypto-Jews
- Spanish and Portuguese Jews
- Sephardim
- Paradesi Jews
