= List of Algerian rabbis =

List of Algerian rabbis:

- Ephraim Alnaqua (1359 – 1442)
- Saadia Ibn Danan (15th century)
- Solomon ben Simon Duran (c. 1400 – 1467)
- Simeon ben Zemah Duran (1361–1444)
- Sidi Fredj Halimi (1876 – 1957)
- Maimun Najar (15th century)
- Nathan Najar (15th century)
- Rahamim Naouri (1902 – 1985)
- Jacob ben Aaron Sasportas (1610 – 1698)
- Isaac ben Sheshet (1326 – 1408)
- Raphael Zeror (1681 – 1737)
- Eliyahu Zini (b. 1946)
