= Timeline of antisemitism =

This timeline of antisemitism chronicles events in the history of antisemitism, hostile actions or discrimination against Jews as members of a religious and ethnic group. It includes events in Jewish history and the history of antisemitic thought, actions which were undertaken in order to counter antisemitism or alleviate its effects, and events that affected the prevalence of antisemitism in later years. The history of antisemitism can be traced from ancient times to the present day.

Some authors prefer to use the terms anti-Judaism or religious antisemitism in reference to religious sentiments against Judaism which were prevalent before the rise of racial antisemitism in the 19th century. For events which specifically pertain to expulsions and exoduses of Jews, see Jewish refugees.

== Antiquity ==
Note: Several of the following events took place earlier than the term "antisemitism" is generally applied. Some even took place when the Israelites and Judeans practiced an early, non-monotheistic form of Judaism known as Yahwism, First Temple Judaism, or First Temple Israelite religion. However, these events feature heavily in the history detailed in the Old Testament, which was foundational to the later establishment of Second Temple Judaism, following the return of the Israelites from Babylon after it was conquered by the Persian Empire.

== In The Pentateuch (Five Books of Moses) ==
Since Abraham is considered the first patriarch of the Jewish people and the first Jew, the first recorded cases of Jew-hatred were against him. The Midrash refers to stories of Abraham as a child in Ur, but the first event as described in the Book of Genesis, chapter 23, describing hatred towards Abraham and the future Jewish people are seen in the negotiations between Abraham and Ephron, son of Zohar, the Hittite, concerning the Cave of Machpelah in Hebron. Abraham's wife, Sarah, had died and Abraham wanted to buy the field and the cave located in it as a burial place. Ephron, the owner, who did not want the Jewish people to own any part of the Holy Land did not negotiate in good faith. In the end he had little choice but to sell and received much more than the going rate. This was the first Jewish acquisition of property in the land promised to Abraham for his descendants. Ephron's unwillingness to sell and subsequent extortion is traditionally attributed to Jew-hatred.

Laban's treatment of his nephew Jacob, exploiting 20 years of labor, exchanging Leah for Rachel in marriage, his begrudging Jacob's acquisition of flocks and his subsequent pursuit and searching Jacob's belongings is understood as the next instance of Jew-hatred (Genesis 29-31).

In Jewish tradition, Esau, Jacob's brother is one archetypal manifestation of a desire to destroy the Jewish people (Genesis 25,19-34; 27; 32,3-16), often associated with the Roman Empire and its Christian successors. Another archetype of an eternal enemy of the Jewish people is the people of Amalek and their desire to kill the Jewish people to the last man (Exodus 17,8-16).

Other examples of incidents interpreted as hate of the Jewish people are Pharaoh and the Egyptians enslaving the Hebrews (Genesis 39-50; Exodus), the Baal-Peor episode (Numbers 25: 6-8, 14-15) and the sunsequent war against the Midianites (Numbers 25:17, 31).

== In Later Parts of the Bible ==
740 BCE
During the Assyrian captivity (or the Assyrian exile), several thousand Israelites of ancient Samaria are resettled as captives by Assyria. The Northern Kingdom of Israel is then conquered by the Neo-Assyrian Empire.

586 BCE
During the reign of King Nebuchadnezzar II, the Neo-Babylonian Empire destroys the temple in Jerusalem and captures the Kingdom of Judah, expelling as many as 10,000 families to Babylon. Judeans are seen here by the Babylonians as a uniform group, marking the beginning of collective persecution.. This First Destruction of Jerusalem and the Babylonian Exile lasted 70 years until the fall of the Babylonian Empire to the Persian king Koresh (כורש), usually identified as Cyrus, and his declaration allowing the Jews to return to Judaea and to rebuild the Temple in Jerusalem as described in the books of Ezra and Nehemiah.

475 BCE
Haman is said in the Book of Esther to attempt genocide against the Jews. The Book of Ester is considered fictional by many historians, but archeological discoveries in Iraq since 2003, a better understanding of the period and reevaluation of the historical background has resulted in a wider acceptance of the historicity of the text. It alludes to a history of conquest by non-Levantine groups for the people of Judea.. The Jew-hating element in the narrative is the unexplained hatred of Haman and his ilk toward the Jewish people as a whole in a period when the Jews were spread out over many of the countries of the Persian-Median Empire as well as being generally accepted in society. By a series of incidents, the planned extermination of the Jewish people was avoided, the implicit cause being Divine intervention without being explicitly mentioned.

175 BCE–165 BCE
The Deuterocanonical First and Second Books of the Maccabees record that Antiochus IV Epiphanes attempts to erect a statue of Zeus in the Temple in Jerusalem and persecutes Jews who follow Jewish law, especially circumcision, sabbath and holidays and dietary laws. He arrests a mother and her seven sons and tries to force them to eat pork. When they refuse, he tortures and kills the sons one by one. The Talmud tells a similar story, as do 4 Maccabees and Josippon. The festival of Hanukkah commemorates the uprising of the Maccabees against this attempt.

139 BCE
Gnaeus Cornelius Scipio Hispanus expels all Jews from the city of Rome.

63 BCE
12,000 Jews are killed by the Romans and many more are sent into the diaspora during Pompey's conquest of the East.

59 BCE
Cicero criticizes Jews, claiming they are too influential in public assemblies. He also refers to Jews and Syrians as "races born to be slaves".

== First century ==
19 CE
Roman Emperor Tiberius expels Jews from Rome. Their expulsion is recorded by the Roman historical writers Suetonius, Josephus, and Cassius Dio.

38 CE
Thousands of Jews killed by mobs in the Alexandrian pogrom, as recounted by Philo of Alexandria in Flaccus. Synagogues are defiled, Jewish leaders are publicly scourged, and the Jewish population, a substantial part of the city's population since its founding by Alexander the Great, is confined to one quarter of the city.. The first century also saw the rise of Judeophobic polemics among writers in the Hellenistic world, e.g. Appion known from Josephus' defence in Against Apion.

50 CE
Jews are ordered by Roman Emperor Claudius "not to hold meetings", in the words of Cassius Dio (Roman History, 60.6.6). Claudius later expelled Jews from Rome, according to both Suetonius ("Lives of the Twelve Caesars", Claudius, Section 25.4) and Acts 18:2.

66 CE
Under the command of Tiberius Julius Alexander, Roman soldiers killed about 50,000 Jews in the Alexandria riot.

66–73 CE
The First Jewish–Roman War against the Romans is crushed by Vespasian and Titus. Titus refuses to accept a wreath of victory, because there is "no merit in vanquishing people forsaken by their own God." (Philostratus, Vita Apollonii). The events of this period were recorded in detail by the Jewish–Roman historian Josephus. His record is largely sympathetic to the Roman point of view and it was written in Rome under Roman protection; hence it is considered a controversial source. Josephus describes the Jewish revolt as being led by "tyrants", to the detriment of the city, and he describes Titus as having "moderation" in his escalation of the Siege of Jerusalem (70).

70 CE
Against a background of oppressive rule by Roman governors, Jewish socioeconomic divides, nationalist aspirations, and rising religious and ethnic tensions, Jewish opposition to Roman interference culminated in the Great Jewish Revolt during Passover of the year 70 CE, the siege and subsequent fall of Jerusalem, the destruction of the temple and the expulsion of the Jews. Over 1,000,000 Jews perished and an additional 97,000 are taken as slaves.. Judaea Capta coinage minted and spread all over Roman Empire to humiliate the Jews.

70 CE
Pogrom against jews in Damascus

94 CE
Fabrications of Apion in Alexandria, Egypt, including the first recorded case of blood libel. Juvenal writes anti-Jewish poetry. Josephus picks apart contemporary and old antisemitic myths in his work Against Apion.

96 CE
Titus Flavius Clemens, nephew of the Roman Emperor Vespasian and supposed convert to Judaism is put to death on charges of atheism.

100 CE
Tacitus writes anti-Jewish polemic in his Histories (book 5). He reports on several old myths of ancient antisemitism (including that of the donkey's head in the Holy of Holies), but the key to his view that Jews "regard the rest of mankind with all the hatred of enemies" is his analysis of the extreme differences between monotheistic Judaism and the polytheism common throughout the Roman world.

== Second century ==
115–117
Thousands of Jews are killed during civil unrest in Egypt, Cyprus, and Cyrenaica, as recounted by Cassius Dio.

119
Roman Emperor Hadrian bans circumcision, making Judaism de facto illegal.

132–135
Crushing of the Bar Kokhba revolt. According to Cassius Dio 580,000 Jews are killed. Hadrian orders the expulsion of Jews from Judea, which is merged with Galilee in order to form the province of Syria Palaestina. Although large Jewish populations remain in Samaria and Galilee, with Tiberias as the headquarters of exiled Jewish patriarchs, this is the start of the Jewish diaspora. Hadrian constructs a pagan temple to Jupiter at the site of the Temple in Jerusalem, builds Aelia Capitolina among the ruins of Jerusalem.

136
In an attempt to wipe out the Jewish character of the land, Hadrian renames Jerusalem Aelia Capitolina and builds a Roman monument over the site of the Temple Mount. Jews are banned from living and visiting Jerusalem and Judea is renamed Syria Palestina, referring to the Greek words for both the Levant as well as the region at the time.. The name Palaestine was taken from a by then ancient and extinct enemy of the Jews, the Philistines as a scorn and a sign of Jewish defeat.

167
Earliest known accusation of Jewish deicide (the notion that Jews were held responsible for the death of Jesus), made in a sermon On the Passover, attributed to Melito of Sardis.

175
Apollinaris the Apologist writes two books against the Jews.

== Third century ==
259
The Jewish community of Nehardea is destroyed.

== Fourth century ==
306
The Synod of Elvira bans intermarriage and sexual intercourse between Christians and Jews and forbids Jews and Christians from eating together.

315
Constantine I enacts various laws regarding the Jews: Jews are not allowed to own Christian slaves or to circumcise their slaves. Conversion of Christians to Judaism is outlawed. Congregations for religious services are restricted, but Jews are also allowed to enter the restituted Jerusalem on the anniversary of the Temple's destruction.

325
Jews are expelled and banned from Jerusalem.

325
First Ecumenical Council of Nicaea. The Christian Church separates the calculation of the date of Easter from the Jewish Passover: "It was ... declared improper to follow the custom of the Jews in the celebration of this holy festival, because, their hands having been stained with crime, the minds of these wretched men are necessarily blinded.... Let us, then, have nothing in common with the Jews, who are our adversaries. ... avoiding all contact with that evil way. ... who, after having compassed the death of the Lord, being out of their minds, are guided not by sound reason, but by an unrestrained passion, wherever their innate madness carries them. ... a people so utterly depraved. ... Therefore, this irregularity must be corrected, in order that we may no more have any thing in common with those parricides and the murderers of our Lord. ... no single point in common with the perjury of the Jews."

330
Rabbah bar Nahmani is forced to flee to the forest where he dies.

339
Intermarriage between Christians and Jews is banned in the Roman Empire, declaring the punishment death.

351
Book burning of Jewish texts in Persia.

351–352
Jewish revolt against Constantius Gallus. Jews rise up against the corrupt rule of Gallus. Many towns are destroyed, thousands are killed.

353
Constantius II institutes a law stating that any Christian who converts to Judaism will have their property confiscated.

380
St. Gregory of Nyssa calls Jews "murders of the Lord, assassins of the prophets, rebels and detesters of God, companions of the devils, a race of vipers."

386
John Chrysostom of Antioch writes eight homilies called Adversus Judaeos (lit: Against the Judaizers). See also: Christianity and antisemitism.

388
1 August: A Christian mob incited by the local bishop plunders and burns down a synagogue in Callinicum. Theodosius I orders that those responsible be punished, and the synagogue is rebuilt at the Christians' expense. Ambrose of Milan insists in his letter that the whole case be dropped. He interrupts the liturgy in the emperor's presence with an ultimatum that he will not continue until the case is dropped. Theodosius complies.

399
The Western Roman Emperor Honorius calls Judaism superstitio indigna (unworthy superstition) and confiscates gold and silver collected by the synagogues for Jerusalem.

== Fifth century ==
408
Roman laws pass which prohibit Jews from setting fire to Haman, stating that they are mocking Christianity.

415
A Jewish uprising in Alexandria claims the lives of many Christians. Bishop Cyril forces his way into the synagogue, expels the Jews (some authors estimate the numbers of Jews expelled up to 100 thousand) and gives their property to the mob. Later, near Antioch, Jews are accused of ritual murder during Purim. Christians confiscate the synagogue. Jews call it "415 C.E. Alexandria Expulsion".

415
An edict issued by the Emperors Honorius and Theodosius II ban building new Synagogues and converting non-Jews to Judaism.

418
The first record of Jews being forced to convert or face expulsion. Bishop Severus of Menorca, claimed to have forced 540 Jews to accept Christianity upon conquering the island. The synagogue in Magona (now Mahón, the capital of Menorca) is burned.

419
The monk Barsauma (not to be confused with the famous Bishop of Nisibis) gathers a group of followers and for the next three years, he destroys synagogues throughout the province of Palestine.

425
The final nasi of the ancient Sanhedrin Gamliel VI is executed by the Roman Empire. This subsequently ended the Jewish patriarchate.

429
The East Roman Emperor Theodosius II orders that all funds raised by Jews to support their schools be turned over to his treasury.

438
Theodosius II's wife visits Jerusalem, and arranges for Jews to visit and pray at the ruins of the Temple Mount. This leads to Jews emigrating to Jerusalem, where some are killed after being stabbed and stoned by local monks. At the trial for the deaths the monks claimed that the stones fell from heaven and thus they were acquitted.

439
The Codex Theodosianus, the first imperial compilation of laws. Jews are prohibited from holding important positions involving money, including judicial and executive offices. The ban against building new synagogues is reinstated. The anti-Jewish statutes also apply to the Samaritans. The Code is also accepted by Western Roman Emperor, Valentinian III.

451
Sassanid ruler Yazdegerd II of Persia's decree abolishes the Sabbath and orders executions of Jewish leaders, including the Exilarch Mar Nuna.

465
Council of Vannes, Gaul prohibited the Christian clergy from participating in Jewish feasts.

469
Half of the Jewish population of Isfahan is put to death and their children are brought up as 'fire-worshippers' over the alleged killing of two Magi Priests.

470
Exilarch Huna V is executed as a result of persecution under King Peroz (Firuz) of Persia.

== Sixth century ==
502
After the Jews of Babylon revolt and gain a short period of independence, the Persian King Kobad crucifies the Exilarch Mar-Zutra II on the bridge of Mahoza.

506
Synagogue of Daphne is destroyed and its inhabitants are massacred by a Christian mob celebrating the result of a chariot race.

517
Christians are banned from participating in Jewish feasts as a result of the Council of Epaone.

519
Ravenna, Italy. After the local synagogues were burned down by the local mob, the Ostrogothic king Theodoric the Great orders the town to rebuild them at its own expense.

529–559
Byzantine Emperor Justinian the Great publishes Corpus Juris Civilis. New laws restrict citizenship to Christians. These regulations determined the status of Jews throughout the Empire for hundreds of years: Jewish civil rights restricted: "they shall enjoy no honors". The principle of Servitus Judaeorum (Servitude of the Jews) is established: the Jews cannot testify against Christians. The emperor becomes an arbiter in internal Jewish matters. The use of the Hebrew language in worship is forbidden. Shema Yisrael ("Hear, O Israel, the Lord is one"), sometimes considered the most important prayer in Judaism, is banned as a denial of the Trinity. Some Jewish communities are converted by force, their synagogues turned into churches.

531
Emperor Justinian rules that Jews cannot testify against Christians. Jewish liturgy is censored for being "anti-trinitarian".

535
Synagogue of Borion is closed and all Jewish practices are prohibited by order of Justinian.

535
The First Council of Clermont prohibits Jews from holding public office.

538
The Third Council of Orléans forbids Jews to employ Christian servants or possess Christian slaves. Jews are prohibited from appearing in the streets during Passion Week: "their appearance is an insult to Christianity". The Merovingian king Childebert approves the measure.

547
Jews and Samaritans in the Caesaria are massacred after a failed revolt.

576
In Clermont, Gaul, Bishop Avitus offers Jews a choice: accept Christianity or leave Clermont. Most emigrate to Marseille.

582
The Merovingians order that all Jews of the kingdom are to be baptized.

589
The Council of Narbonne, Septimania, forbids Jews from chanting psalms while burying their dead. Anyone violating this law is fined 6 ounces of gold. The third Council of Toledo, held under Visigothic King Reccared, bans Jews from slave ownership and holding positions of authority, and reiterates the mutual ban on intermarriage. Reccared also rules children out of such marriages to be raised as Christians.

590–591
The Exilarch Haninai is executed by Khosrau II for supporting Mihrevandak. This halted all forms of Jewish self-governance for over 50 years.

592
The entire Jewish population of Antioch is punished because a Jew violated a law.

598
Bishop Victor of Palermo seizes the local synagogues and repurposes them into churches. In response, Pope Gregory I issues a letter of papal promise of protection for the Jews, the Sicut Iudaeis, which sets out the papal policy and will be later re-issued by various of his successors.

== Seventh century ==
608–610
Massacres of Jews all across the Byzantine Empire.

610–620
After many of his anti-Jewish edicts were ignored, King Sisebur prohibits Judaism in Hispania and Septimania. Those not baptized fled. This was the first incidence where a prohibition of Judaism affected an entire country.

614
Fifth Council of Paris decrees that all Jews holding military or civil positions must accept baptism, together with their families.

615
Italy. The earliest referral to the Juramentum Judaeorum (the Jewish Oath): the concept that no heretic could be believed in court against a Christian. The oath became standardized throughout Europe in 1555.

617
After breaking their promise of Jewish autonomy in Jerusalem, the Persians forbid Jews from settling within three miles of the city

626–627
The Council of Clichy declared that any Jew who accepts public office must convert.

627
Between 600 and 900 Jewish male captives including any boys showing signs of puberty are beheaded by Muslims on Muhammed's orders, many in front of their families, and the rest of the Jews are taken or sold into slavery in the Massacre of Banu Qurayza.

628
93 Jews are killed in the Battle of Khaybar. Among others, the 17-year-old Jew Safiyya bint Huyayy is enslaved by Muslims, bought by Muhammed to his bed on the very night of the day when her husband was tortured and beheaded and her family is slaughtered, and later manumitted and married to him.

629
Byzantine Emperor Heraclius with his army marches into Jerusalem. Jewish inhabitants support him after his promise of amnesty. Upon his entry into Jerusalem the local priests convince him that killing Jews is a good deed. The only Jews that survived were the ones who fled to Egypt or the mountains.

629
Frankish King Dagobert I, encouraged by Byzantine Emperor Heraclius, expels all Jews from the kingdom.

632
The first case of officially sanctioned forced baptism. Emperor Heraclius violates the Codex Theodosianus, which protected them from forced conversions.

634–641
Jews living in the Levant are forced to pay the Jizya as a result of the Arab-Islamic Conquest of the Levant

640
Jews are expelled by Caliph Umar from Arabia.

642
The Jizya is imposed on the native Jews of Egypt, Cyrenaica, Tripolitania and Fezzan.

653
The Jews of Toledo are forced to convert or be expelled.

681
The Twelfth Council of Toledo enacts antisemitic laws including the burning of the Talmud and Jewish books.

682
Visigothic king Erwig begins his reign by enacting 28 anti-Jewish laws. He presses for the "utter extirpation of the pest of the Jews" and decrees that all converts must be registered by a parish priest, who must issue travel permits. All holidays, Christian and Jewish, must be spent in the presence of a priest to ensure piety and to prevent the backsliding.

692
Quinisext Council in Constantinople forbids Christians on pain of excommunication to bathe in public baths with Jews, employ a Jewish doctor or socialize with Jews.

694
17th Council of Toledo. King Ergica believes rumors that the Jews had conspired to ally themselves with the Islamic invaders and forces Jews to give all land, slaves and buildings bought from Christians, to his treasury. He declares that all Jewish children over the age of seven should be taken from their homes and raised as Christians.

== Eighth century ==
717
Possible date for the Pact of Umar, a document that specified severe restrictions on Jews and Christians (dhimmi) living under Islamic rule. However, academic historians believe that this document was actually compiled at a much later date.

720
Caliph Omar II bans Jewish worship on the Temple Mount.

722
Byzantine emperor Leo III forcibly converts all Jews and Montanists in the empire into mainstream Byzantine Christianity.

740
First Archbishop of York Ecgbert bans Christians from eating with Jews.

787
Empress Irena decries the practice of forced conversion against Jews.

788
Idriss I attacks Jewish communities, imposes high per capita taxes, and forces them to provide annual virgins for his harem for refusing to attack other Jewish communities. According to Maghrebi tradition, the Jewish tribe Ubaid Allah left and settled in Djerba.

== Ninth century ==
807
Abbasid Caliph Harun al-Rashid orders all Jews in the Caliphate to wear a yellow belt, with Christians to wear a blue one.

820
Agobard, Archbishop of Lyon, declares in his essays that Jews are accursed and demands a complete segregation of Christians and Jews. In 826 he issues a series of pamphlets to convince Emperor Louis the Pious to attack "Jewish insolence", but fails to convince the Emperor.

850
Caliph Al-Mutawakkil decrees that Dhimmi — Jews and Christians — wear the zunnar, honey-coloured outer garments and badge-like patches on their servants' clothing to distinguish them from Muslims. Further, their places of worship are to be destroyed with demonic effigies nailed to the door and they are to be allowed little involvement in government or official matters.

870
Ahmad ibn Tulun flattens Jewish cemeteries and replaces them with Muslim tombs.

874
Basil I decrees that all Byzantine Jews are to be baptized, by force if necessary.

878–879
Around 120,000–200,000 foreign merchants (including Jews, Muslim Arabs, Muslim Persians, Zoroastrian Persians, and Christians) are slaughtered in Guangzhou, China.

884
Basil I reinforces law that prohibits Jews from holding any civil or military position in Epanagoge.

888
Church council in Metz forbids Christians and Jews from eating together.

888
The Aghlabids issue decrees according to which Jews and Christians are to wear a patch (ruq'a) of white fabric on their shoulder of their outer garment, with the patch for Jews depicting an ape and that for the Christians depicting a pig.

== Tenth century ==
925
Jews of Oria are raided by a Muslim mob during a series of attacks on Italy. At least ten rabbinical leaders and many more are taken as captives. Among those captured is 12-year-old Shabbethai Donnolo who would go on later to be a famous physician and astronomer.

931
Bishop Ratherius of Verona begs the town elders to expel the Jews from the city until they agree to temporarily expel them.

931–942
Romanos I Lekapenos decreed that all Jews should be forced to convert and subjugated if they refuse. This leads to the death of hundreds of Jews and the destruction of numerous synagogues.

932
The Jewish quarter of Bari, Italy is destroyed by a mob and a number of Jews are killed.

943–944
Byzantine Jews from all over the Empire flee from persecution into Khazaria. The King of Khazaria at the time, who was Jewish, subsequently cut ties with the Byzantine Empire.

945
Venice bans Jews from using Venetian vessels.

985
Entire Jewish population of Sparta is expelled after Nikon the Metanoeite says it will rid the city of a plague.

985
A number of Jewish residents in Barcelona are killed by the Muslim leader Almanzor. All Jewish owned land is handed over to the Count of Barcelona.

== Eleventh century ==
1008
Caliph Al-Hakim bi-Amr Allah ("the Mad") issues severe restrictions against Jews in the Fatimid Empire. All Jews are forced to wear a heavy wooden "golden calf" around their necks. Christians had to wear a large wooden cross and members of both groups had to wear black hats.

1009
Caliph al-Hakim bi-Amr Allah orders the destruction of synagogues, Torah scrolls and Jewish artifacts among other non-Muslim buildings.

1010
The Jews of Limoges are given the choice of baptism or exile.

1011
The Abbasid Caliph Al-Qadir publishes the Baghdad Manifesto, which accuses the Fatimids of being descended from Jews, instead of being "family of the prophet".

1011
A Muslim mob attacks a Jewish funeral procession, resulting in the arrest of 23 Jews.

1011
Pogrom against Sephardic Jews in Córdoba by a Muslim mob.

1012
One of the first known persecutions of Jews in Germany: Henry II, Holy Roman Emperor expels Jews from Mainz.

1013
During the fall of the city, Sulayman's troops looted Córdoba and massacred citizens of the city, including many Jews. Prominent Jews in Córdoba, such as Samuel ibn Naghrela were forced to flee to the city in 1013.

1016
The Jewish community of Kairouan, Tunisia is forced to choose between conversion and expulsion.

1021
A violent earthquake occurs, which some Greeks maintain is caused by a desecration of Jesus by the Jews. For this a number of Roman Jews are burnt at the stake.

1026
Probable date of the chronicle of Raoul Glaber. The French chronicler blamed the Jews for the destruction of the Church of the Holy Sepulchre, which was destroyed in 1009 by Islamic Caliph Al-Hakim. As a result, Jews were expelled from Limoges and other French towns.

1033
Temim ibn Ziri conquers Fez, Morocco and decimates the Jewish community, massacring 6,000 Jews during the Fez massacre.

1035
Sixty Jews are put to death in Castrojeriz during a revolt, because the Jews were considered "property" of the kingdom by the locals.

1039
A Muslim mob raids the palace of the Jewish vizier and kills him after the ruler al-Mondhir is assassinated.

1040
Exilarch Hezekiah Gaon is imprisoned and tortured to death by the Buyyids. The death of Hezekiah ended the line of the Geonim, which had begun four centuries earlier.

1050
Council of Narbonne, France forbids Christians to live in Jewish homes.

1066
Granada massacre: Muslim mob stormed the royal palace in Granada, crucified Jewish vizier Joseph ibn Naghrela and massacred most of the Jewish population of the city. "More than 1,500 Jewish families, numbering 4,000 persons, fell in one day."

1071
Jerusalem falls to the Seljuk Turks, many synagogues are destroyed and life for Jews in Jerusalem becomes much more restricted.

1078
Council of Girona decrees Jews to pay taxes for support of the Catholic Church to the same extent as Christians.

1090
The Jewish community of Granada, which had recovered after the attacks of 1066, attacked again at the hands of the Almoravides led by Yusuf ibn Tashfin, bringing the golden age of Jewish culture in Spain to end.

1092
The Synod of Szabolcs prohibits Jews from working on Sunday or marrying Christians.

1096
The First Crusade. Three hosts of crusaders pass through several Central European cities. The third, unofficial host, led by Count Emicho, decides to attack the Jewish communities, most notably in the Rhineland, under the slogan: "Why fight Christ's enemies abroad when they are living among us?" Eimicho's host attacks the synagogue at Speyer and kills all the defenders. 800 are killed in Worms. Another 1,200 Jews commit suicide in Mainz to escape his attempt to forcibly convert them (see German Crusade, 1096), and 600 are massacred in Mainz on 27 May. Attempts by the local bishops remained fruitless. All in all, 5,000 Jews were murdered.

1099
Jews fight side by side with Muslim soldiers to defend Jerusalem against the Crusaders and face massacres when it falls. According to the Muslim chronicle of Ibn al-Qalanisi, "The Jews assembled in their synagogue, and the Franks burned it over their heads." However, a contemporary Jewish communication does not corroborate the report that Jews were actually inside of the Synagogue when it was set on fire. This letter was discovered among the Cairo Geniza collection in 1975 by historian Shelomo Dov Goitein. Historians believe that it was written just two weeks after the siege, making it "the earliest account on the conquest in any language." However, all sources agree that a synagogue was indeed burned during the siege.

"Initially the city suffered from major depopulation. Its Jewish and Moslem residents, who had accounted for most of the city's populace on the eve of the Crusader invasion, were murdered or sold into slavery. Following the massacre a decree was issued forbidding Jews and Moslems to reside in Jerusalem."

== Twelfth century ==
1108
Many Jews are massacred and their houses and synagogues are burned following a Muslim victory at the Battle of Uclés (1108). Of those murdered is Solomon ibn Farissol, the leader of the Castile community. This incident greatly impacted the Hebrew poet Judah HaLevi, and completely shifted the focus of his poetry.

1113
Upon the death of Sviatopolk II of Kiev, leader of the Kievan Rus', widespread riots and plundering of Jewish homes commenced.

1124
The Jewish quarter of Kyiv is destroyed by arson.

1135
A Muslim mob in Córdoba storms into Jewish homes, takes their possessions and kills a number of them.

1141
During The Anarchy, the fight for succession between Matilde and Stephen, the Jews of Oxford are forced to pay ransom to both sides of the conflict or their houses are to be burned. Stephen burns the house of Aaron son of Isaac and threatens the rest of the community if they do not pay him.

1143
150 Jews are killed in Ham, Somme.

1144
The case of William of Norwich, a contrived accusation of murder by Jews in Norwich, England.

1145
Abd al-Mu'min gives the Jewish population of Sijilmasa the choice of converting to Islam or death. At least 150 Jews who refuse to convert are massacred.

1146
100,000 Jews are massacred by the Almohad Caliphate in Fez, Morocco and 120,000 in Marrakesh.

1147
Jews are expelled from al-Andalus (Muslim-ruled Iberia).

1148
The mostly-Jewish town Lucena, Córdoba is captured by the Almohad Caliphate and local Jews are given the choice of Islam or death. This was the end of the Jewish community of Lucena.

1148–1212
Rule of the Almohad Caliphate in al-Andalus. Only Jews who had converted to Christianity or Islam were allowed to live in Granada. One of the refugees was Maimonides, who settled first in Fez and later in Fustat near Cairo.

1160
Appalled by the annual practice of beating Jews during Palm Sunday, Bishop William issues an order which would excommunicate any priest who continues the practice.

1165
Forced mass conversions of Jews to Islam in Yemen.

1165
New Almohad ruler decrees that all Jews in Fez must convert to Islam or face death. Judah ha-Kohen ibn Shushan is burnt alive for refusing and Maimonides was displaced and permanently leaves for Egypt.

1168
Harold of Gloucester is found floating in a river. The local Benedictine monks use the discovery to claim that "the child had been spirited away by the Jews on the 21st February for them to torture him to death on the night of 16th March". It established that the mythology created around William of Norwich's death could be used as a template for explaining later deaths.

1171
In Blois, France 31 Jews were burned at the stake for blood libel including Pulcelina of Blois

1171
Jews of Bologna are expelled for no known reason.

1173
Following multiple church-inspired riots, Mieszko III of Poland forbids all kinds of violence against the Jews of Poland.

1177
Alfonso II of Aragon creates a charter which defines the status of Jews in Teruel. Jews are defined as "slaves of the king, belonging entirely to the royal treasury." The fee for killing a Jew is half of what the fee is for killing a Christian and is to be paid directly to the king (since Jews are considered property of the crown).

1179
The Third Council of the Lateran, Canon 26, forbids Jews to be plaintiffs or witnesses against Christians in the courts or withhold inheritance from descendants who had accepted Christianity.

1179
The body of a Christian girl is found near the shore. The Jews of Boppard are blamed for her death, resulting in 13 Jews being murdered.

1180
Philip II of France, after four months in power, imprisons all the Jews in his lands and demands a ransom for their release.

1181
Philip Augustus II annuls all loans made by Jews to Christians and takes a percentage for himself. A year later, he confiscates all Jewish property and expels the Jews from Paris.

1181
The Assize of Arms of 1181 orders that all weapons held by Jews must be confiscated, claiming they have no use for them. This led to the Jewish community of England being a lot more vulnerable during anti-Jewish riots.

1182
Jews are expelled from Orléans. 99 Jews are burned alive in Brie-Comte-Robert.

1184
Jewish martyr Elhanan, the son of Isaac ben Samuel, is murdered for refusing to convert.

1188
The Saladin tithe: Jews are taxed 25% of their income and personal worth, while Christians are taxed 10%.

1189
Frederick Barbarossa, Holy Roman Emperor, orders priests not to preach against Jews.

1189
A Jewish deputation attending coronation of Richard the Lionheart was attacked by the crowd. Pogroms in London followed and spread around England.

1190
All the Jews of Norwich, England found in their houses were slaughtered, except a few who found refuge in the castle.

1190
57 Jews in St. Edmunds are killed in a massacre on Palm Sunday.

1190
500 Jews of York were massacred after a six-day siege by departing members of the Third Crusade, backed by several people indebted to Jewish money-lenders.

1190
Saladin conquers the Kingdom of Jerusalem from the Crusaders and lifts the ban for Jews to live in Jerusalem.

1191
More than 80 Jews in Bray-sur-Seine are burned at the stake after trying to execute a murderer who had killed an Israelite.

1195
After falsely being accused of ritual murder with no evidence, the daughter of Rabbi Isaac bar Asher ha-Levi is murdered, dismembered and her body parts are hung around the market place for days. Ha-Levi was killed the following day along with 8 other Jews after trying to recover what was left of his daughter's body from the mob.

1197
In an attempt to isolate the Jewish population economically, Christians were barred from buying food from Jews or having conversations with them under the threat of excommunication.

1198
Philip Augustus readmits Jews to Paris, only after another ransom was paid and a taxation scheme was set up to procure funds for himself. August: Saladin's nephew al-Malik, caliph of Yemen, summons all the Jews and forcibly converts them.

== Thirteenth century ==
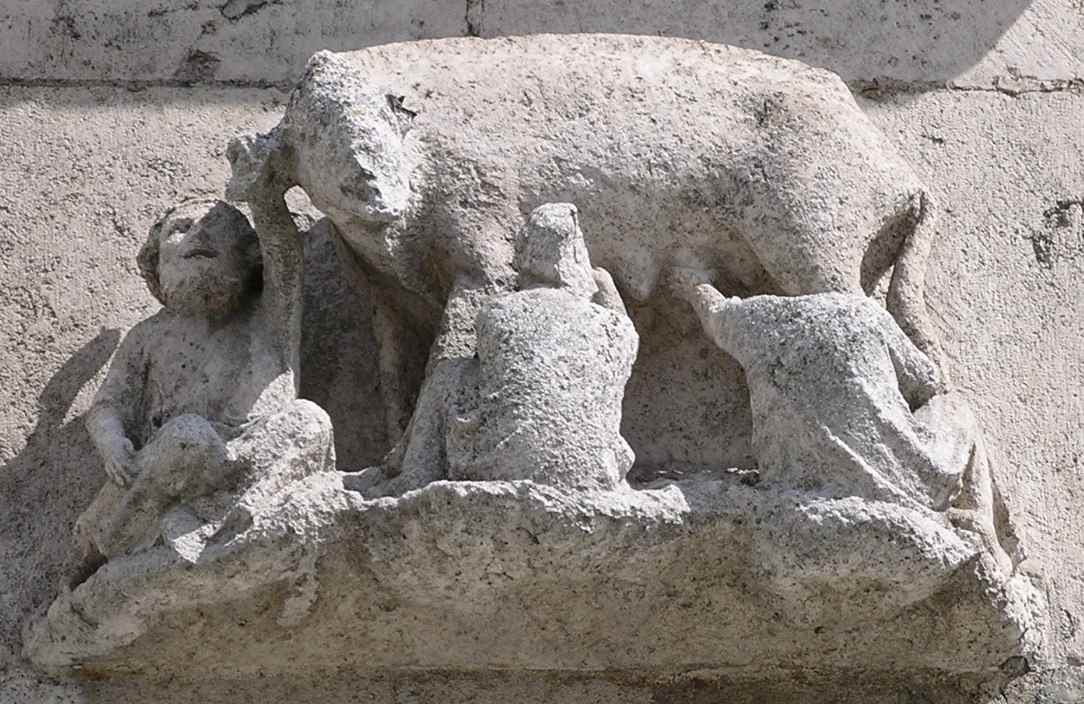
Judensau at the Cathedral of St. Peter in Regensburg] ;13th century: Germany.

Appearance of Judensau: literally: Jew-sow: obscene and dehumanizing imagery of Jews suckling a sow, ranging from etchings to Cathedral ceilings. The consumption of swine, including their milk are forbidden according to Jewish law, so the insult was a double one. Its popularity lasted for over 600 years.

1203
Jewish quarter of Constantinople is burned down by crusaders during the Siege of Constantinople (1203).

1204
In 1204 the papacy required Jews to segregate themselves from Christians and to wear distinctive clothing.

1205
Jews are expelled from villages and towns all around Spain by Muslims.

1206
Jewish homes are burned, looted, Israelites are killed and the remaining Jewish population of Halle is expelled.

1209
Béziers is stormed and its inhabitants are massacred. Among those were 200 Jews. All Jewish children who survived, and did not flee, were forcibly baptized.

1209
Raymond VI, Count of Toulouse, humiliated and forced to swear that he would implement social restrictions against Jews.

1210
King John of England imprisoned much of the Jewish population until they paid up 66,000 marks.

1212
Forced conversions and mass murder of the Jewish community of Toledo.

1215
The Fourth Lateran Council headed by Pope Innocent III declares: "Jews and Saracens of both sexes in every Christian province and at all times shall be marked off in the eyes of the public from other peoples through the character of their dress." (Canon 68). See Judenhut. The Fourth Lateran Council also noted that the Jews' own law required the wearing of identifying symbols. Pope Innocent III also reiterated papal injunctions against forcible conversions, and added: "No Christian shall do the Jews any personal injury...or deprive them of their possessions...or disturb them during the celebration of their festivals...or extort money from them by threatening to exhume their dead."

1217
French noblewoman Alix de Montmorency imprisons the Jewish population of Toulouse for refusing to convert. She eventually released them all except for children under six, who were taken and adopted by Christians.

1221
An anti-Jewish riot erupts in Erfurt, where the Jewish quarter is destroyed along with two synagogues. Around 26 Jews are killed, and others throw themselves into fire rather than be forcibly converted. Samuel of Speyer was among those martyred.

1222
Council of Oxford: Archbishop of Canterbury Stephen Langton forbids Jews from building new synagogues, owning slaves or mixing with Christians.

1223
Louis VIII of France prohibits his officials from recording debts owed to Jews, reversing his father's policy of seeking such debts.

1227
The Synod of Narbonne reaffirms the antisemitic decrees of the Fourth Lateran Council.

1229
Raymond VII, Count of Toulouse, heir of Raymond VI, also forced to swear that he would implement social restrictions against Jews.

1229
Treaty of Jaffa is signed between Frederick II and the Sultan Al-Kamil of Egypt. Jews are once again banned from residing in Jerusalem.

1230
Theodore Komnenos Doukas is defeated. Since Theodore decreed many anti-Jewish laws and seized Jewish property, he was handed over to two Jews by John Asen II to personally kill him. After having pity on him and refusing to kill Theodore, the Czar had the Jews thrown off a cliff.

1232
Forced mass conversions in Marrakesh, over 1,000 Moroccan Jews are killed.

1235
The Jews of Fulda, Germany were accused of ritual murder. To investigate the blood libel, Emperor Frederick II held a special conference of Jewish converts to Christianity at which the converts were questioned about Jewish ritual practice. Letters inviting prominent individuals to the conference still survive. At the conference, the converts stated unequivocally that Jews do not harm Christian children or require blood for any rituals. In 1236 the Emperor published these findings and in 1247 Pope Innocent IV, the Emperor's enemy, also denounced accusations of the ritual murder of Christian children by Jews. In 1272, the papal repudiation of the blood libel was repeated by Pope Gregory X, who also ruled that thereafter any such testimony of a Christian against a Jew could not be accepted unless it is confirmed by another Jew. Unfortunately, these proclamations from the highest sources were not effective in altering the beliefs of the Christian majority and the libels continued.

1236
Crusaders attack Jewish communities of Anjou and Poitou and attempt to baptize all the Jews. Those who resisted (est. 3,000) were slaughtered.

1236
A Jew and a Christian fisherman get into a heated argument about prices, which turns physical. It ends when the Jew deals a devastating blow to the Gentile's head which leads to his death. This enrages the local Christian population, who attack the Jewish quarter of Narbonne. Don Aymeric, the governor of Narbonne prevents a massacre and restores all stolen Jewish property to their rightful owner.

1240
John I, Duke of Brittany expels Jews from Brittany.

1240
Disputation of Paris. Pope Gregory IX puts Talmud on trial on the charges that it contains blasphemy against Jesus and Mary and attacks on the Church.

1241
A pogrom against the Jews of Frankfurt takes place after conflicts over Jewish-Christian marriages and the enforced baptism of interfaith couples. 180 Jews are killed as a result and 24 agree to be baptized. This became known as the Judenschlacht (German for Slaughter of the Jews).

1241
In England, first of a series of royal levies against Jewish finances, which forced the Jews to sell their debts to non-Jews at cut prices.

1242
Following a show trial, the Talmud is "convicted" of corrupting the Jews. 24 cart-loads of hand-written Talmudic manuscripts, some 10,000 volumes and comprising most of the extant volumes in France, are burned in the streets of Paris.

1242
James I of Aragon orders Jews to listen to conversion sermons and to attend churches. Friars are given power to enter synagogues uninvited.

1243
The first ever accusation of Host Desecration. The entire Jewish population of Beelitz was burned at the stake after being accused of torturing Jesus and the spot it happened was named "Judenberg".

1243
11 Jews are tortured to death following a blood libel in Kitzingen Germany.

1244
Pope Innocent IV orders Louis IX of France to burn all Talmud copies.

1249
Alphonse of Poitiers orders the expulsion of all Jews in Poitiers.

1250
Zaragoza Spain: death of a choirboy Saint Dominguito del Val prompts ritual murder accusation. His sainthood was revoked in the 20th century but reportedly a chapel dedicated to him still exists in the Cathedral of Zaragoza.

1250
The Hafsid caliph in the Magrheb issues a decree that Jews and Christians must wear a distinguishing badge. The so-called shikla continues to be in use for Tunisian Jews into the nineteenth century.

1251
The Shepherds' Crusade attacks Jewish communities across northern France.

1253
Henry III of England introduces harsh anti-Jewish laws. These are known as the Statute of Jewry.

1254
Louis IX threatens any Jew who keeps a copy of the Talmud or engages in moneylending with expulsion.

1255
Henry III of England sells his rights to the Jews (regarded as royal "chattels") to his brother Richard for 5,000 marks.

1257
The Badge of shame is imposed locally on the Italian Jews.

1260
Mongols are defeated and Syria is brought under Mamluk rule. Anti-Jewish laws are once again decreed, and Jewish life becomes a lot more restricted in the Levant.

1260
Jews are banned from ascending above the 7th step on the Cave of the Patriarchs. This ban would last 700 years.

1260
Thomas Aquinas publishes Summa Contra Gentiles, a summary of Christian faith to be presented to those who reject it. The Jews who refuse to convert are regarded as "deliberately defiant" rather than "invincibly ignorant".

1263
Disputation of Barcelona.

1264
Pope Clement IV assigns Talmud censorship committee.

1264
Simon de Montfort inspires massacre of Jews in London.

1265
German-Jewish convert Abraham of Augsburg publicly assails Christianity, severs the heads of crucifix figurines and is sentenced to torture and death by burning.

1267
In a special session, the Vienna city council forces Jews to wear Pileum cornutum (a cone-shaped headdress, prevalent in many medieval illustrations of Jews). This distinctive dress is an addition to Yellow badge Jews were already forced to wear.

1267
The Synod of Vienna forbids Christians from attending Jewish ceremonies, and Jews from debating with "simple Christian people" about the beliefs of the Catholic religion.

1267
The Synod of Breslau orders Jews to live in a segregated quarter.

1267
After an accusation from an old woman that the Jews had bought a Christian child from her to kill, the entire Jewish community of Pforzheim face massacres and expulsion. Rabbi Samuel ben Yaḳar ha-Levi, Rabbi Isaac ben Eliezer and Rabbi Abraham ben Gershom commit suicide to escape the cruel torture they feared.

1275
King Edward I of England passes the Statute of the Jewry forcing Jews over the age of seven to wear an identifying yellow badge, and making usury illegal, in order to seize their assets. Scores of English Jews are arrested, 300 hanged and their property goes to the Crown.

1276
Massacre in Fez to kill all Jews stopped by intervention of the Emir

1278
The Edict of Pope Nicholas III requires compulsory attendance of Jews at conversion sermons.

1279
The Synod of Ofen forbids Christians to sell or rent real estate to or from Jews.

1280
Edward I of England orders Jews to be present as Dominicans preach conversion.

1282
John Pectin, Archbishop of Canterbury, orders all London synagogues to close and prohibits Jewish physicians from practicing on Christians.

1283
Philip III of France causes mass migration of Jews by forbidding them to live in the small rural localities.

1283
10 Jews are slain in Mainz after claims of blood libel.

1285
Blood libel in Munich, Germany results in the death of 68 Jews. 180 more Jews are burned alive at the synagogue.

1287
Edward I of England arrests heads of Jewish families and demands their communities pay ransom of 12,000 pounds.

1287
A 16-year-old boy is found dead in the Rhine. Immediately the Jews of Oberwesel are accused of killing the boy. Over 40 men, women and children were killed by rioters as a response.

1287
Jews are arrested and accused of coin clipping. Even without evidence, the whole community is convicted and expelled.

1288
The Jewish population of Troyes is accused of ritual murder. 13 Jewish martyrs are burned at the stake, sacrificing themselves to spare the rest of the community.

1288
104 Jews in Bonn, Germany are killed during a pogrom.

1289
Jews are expelled from Gascony and Anjou.

1290
Edict of Expulsion: Edward I expels all Jews from England, allowing them to take only what they could carry, all the other property became the Crown's. Official reason: continued practice of usury.

1290
A Jewish man named Jonathan and his wife are accused of stabbing the wafer to torture Jesus. They are both burned at the stake, their house is destroyed and replaced with a chapel.

1290
The Jews of Baghdad are massacred.

1290
18 July Edward I of England issues Edict of Expulsion, decreeing all Jews to be expelled from England.

1291
Philip the Fair publishes an ordinance prohibiting the Jews to settle in France.

1291
Jewish physician and grand vizier Sa'ad al-Dawla is killed by Muslims who felt it a degradation to have a Jew placed over them. Persian Jews suffer a long-period of violent persecution by the Muslim population.

1292
Forced conversion and expulsion of the Jews from Campania and Basilicata.

1298
Accusations of Host desecration against the German Jews. More than 140 Jewish communities face forced conversions.

1298
During the civil war between Adolph of Nassau and Albrecht of Austria, German knight Rintfleisch claims to have received a mission from heaven to exterminate "the accursed race of the Jews". Under his leadership, the mob goes from town to town destroying Jewish communities and massacring about 100,000 Jews, often by mass burning at stake. Among 146 localities in Franconia, Bavaria and Austria are Röttingen (20 April), Würzburg (24 July), Nuremberg (1 August).

== Fourteenth century ==
1301
Riots break out in Egypt, which are encouraged by the Mamluks. Many Jews are forcibly converted to Islam, including the entire Jewish population of Bilbeis. Many synagogues are appropriated into mosques.

1305
Philip IV of France seizes all Jewish property (except the clothes they wear) and expels them from France (approx. 100,000). His successor Louis X of France allows French Jews to return in 1315.

1306
Jews of Sens, Yonne department of France, are expelled. This was the third and final expulsion (after those in 876 and 1198).

1306
Jews expelled from Castelsarrasin, France.

1309
Rhodes falls to the Crusaders, who went on a rampage against the local Jews.

1310
The Synod of Mainz defines the adoption of Judaism by a Christian or the return of a baptized Jew to Judaism as heresy subject to punishment.

1310
Frederick II of Aragon adopts anti-Jewish laws, which require them to mark their clothes and shops with the yellow badge. Jews were also forbidden from having any relationship with Catholics.

1314
Jews expelled from Halle (Saale)

1318
Rashid-al-Din Hamadani, a Persian Jewish convert to Islam was executed on fake charges of poisoning Öljeitü and for several days crowds carried his head around his native city of Tabriz, chanting "This is the head of the Jew who abused the name of God; may God's curse be upon him!"

1319
Jews are expelled from Breslau.

1320
Jews are expelled from Milan during a persecution of so-called heretics.

1320
152 Jews massacred in Castelsarrasin, France.

1320
Shepherds' Crusade attacks the Jews of 120 localities in southwest France.

1321
King Henry II of Castile forces Jews to wear Yellow badge.

1321
Jews in central France accused of ordering lepers to poison wells. After massacre of est. 5,000 Jews, King Philip V admits they were innocent.

1321
A Muslim mob destroys a synagogue in Damascus.

1328
5,000 Jews are massacred and their houses are burned down following anti-Jewish preaching by a Franciscan friar from Estella, near Pamplona. That same years, the Jews of Navarre choose to burn their homes and synagogues and drown their children rather than be forcibly converted.

1328
Jewish martyr Aaron ben Zerah, along with his wife and four of his sons are executed.

1333
Forced mass conversions in Baghdad

1336
Armleder persecutions against Jews in Franconia and Alsace led by lawless German bands, the Armleder under the highwayman Arnold von Uissigheim. Roughly 1500 Jews are killed.

1336
The Aleinu prayer is banned in Castile.

1337-1338
Pogroms over host desecration across Bavaria, Austria, and Bohemia. The Jews are accused of stealing the bread of the Eucharist and trying to burn it. In Wolfsberg, Carinthia, over 70 Jews are burned at the stake and the entire Jewish community is destroyed.

1344
The citizens of Speyer ask the King's permission to confiscate the houses of the Jews for the cities benefit – he grants their request.

1348
European Jews are blamed for the plague in the Black Death persecutions. Charge laid to the Jews that they poisoned the wells. Massacres spread throughout Spain, France, Germany and Austria. More than 200 Jewish communities destroyed by violence. Many communities have been expelled and settle down in Poland.

1349
Basel: 600 Jews burned at the stake, 140 children forcibly baptized, the remaining city's Jews expelled. The city synagogue is turned into a church and the Jewish cemetery is destroyed.

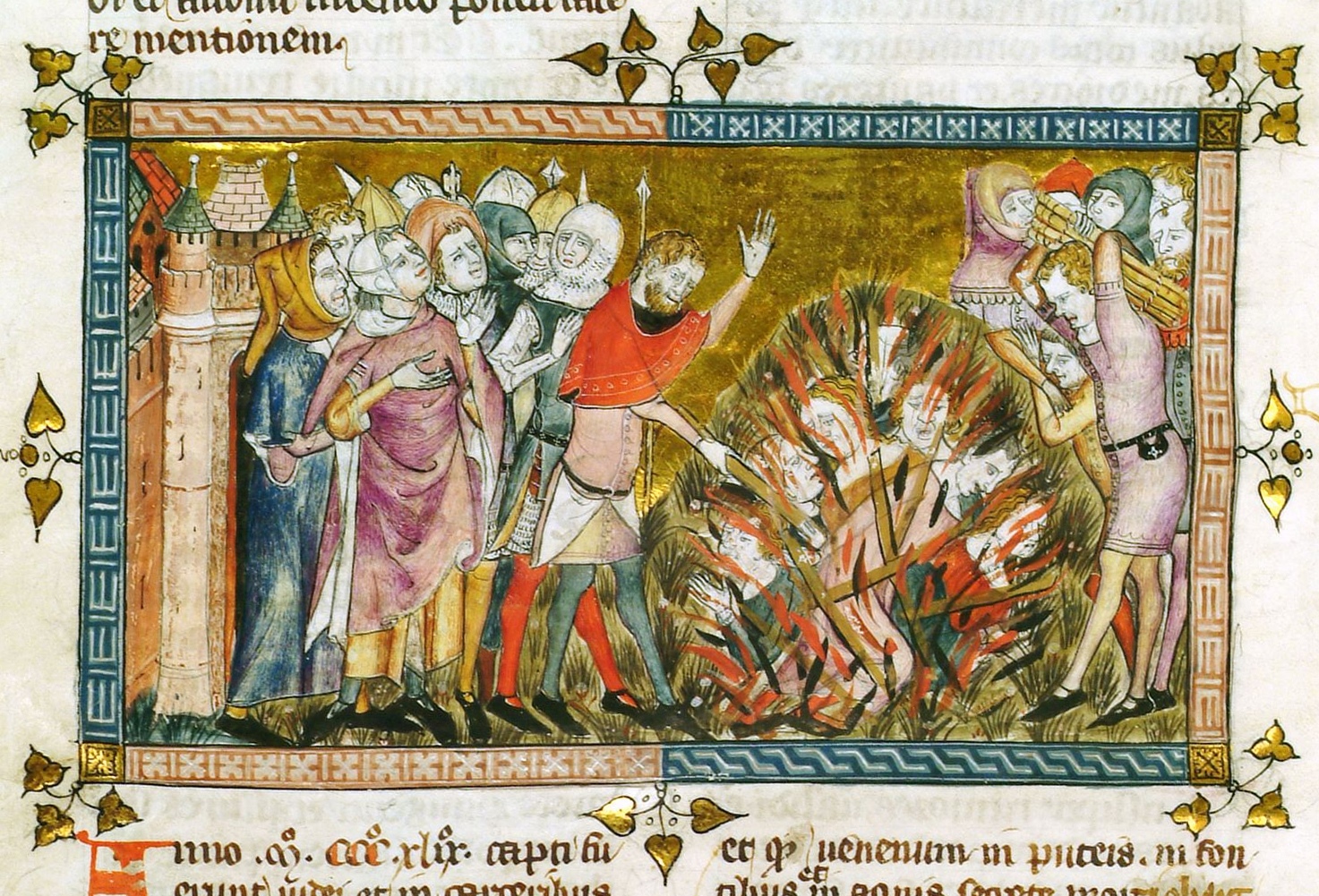
1349 burning of Jews (from a European chronicle written on the Black Death between 1349 and 1352)

1349
The Erfurt massacre was a massacre of around 3,000 Jews as a result of Black Death Jewish persecutions

1349
The entire Jewish population of Speyer is destroyed. All Jews are either killed, converted, or fled. All their property and assets was confiscated. Part of the Black Death Jewish persecutions.

1349
600 Jews are burned at the stake and the entire Jewish community of Zurich is annihilated as a part of the Black Death Jewish persecutions.

1349
The Jewish community of Worms is completely destroyed as a result of the Black Death Jewish persecutions. Hundreds of Jews set fire to their homes to avoid the oncoming torture. Their property was seized by the locals.

1349
Jews of Berlin are expelled and many are killed as a part of the Black Death Jewish persecutions.

1349
Jews of Breslau are expelled as part of the Black Death Jewish persecutions. The city claims all property and synagogues, while the Emperor was given the cemetery and all Jewish debts. 60 Jews are murdered.

1349
The Jewish quarter of Cologne is destroyed by an angry mob, and most of the community is killed. All of their property was split up between the ransackers. It was part of the Black Death Jewish persecutions.

1349
The Strasbourg massacre was a part of the Black Death persecutions, where several hundred Jews were publicly burned to death, and the rest of them were expelled. It was one of the first and worst pogroms in pre-modern history.

1349
The Jews of Halle (Saale) are attacked.

24 August 1349
6,000 Jews are burned to death in Mainz as a part of the Black Death Jewish persecutions. When the angry mob charged, the Jews initially fought back, killing around 200 of their attackers.

1350
Brussels Jewish community is decimated after they are blamed for the Plague.

1352
Church officials order the expulsion of Jews from Bulgaria for "heretical activity".

1359
Charles V of France allows Jews to return for a period of 20 years in order to pay ransom for his father John II of France, imprisoned in England. The period is later extended beyond the 20 years.

1360
Jews are expelled from Breslau.

1360
Jews expelled from Hungary by Louis I of Hungary.

1360
Furious with a pogrom against Castilian Jews in Miranda de Ebro, Peter of Castile publicly boils one of the perpetrators, roasts another, and executes others with an axe.

1360
Sephardic Jew Samuel ben Meir Abulafia is arrested and tortured to death in prison for no apparent reason. His lands are confiscated by the king.

1365
Jews of Metz are expelled after their presence is cited as the cause of lightning strikes which destroyed twenty-two houses.

1367
Host desecration trials are held against the Jews of Barcelona. They were initiated by the crown prince Don Juan of Aragon.

1367
No fewer than 1600 homes belonging to conversos are destroyed and many conversos are killed in Toledo.

1368
The Synod of Lavour prohibits the sale or transfer of Church property to Jews.

1370
The entire Jewish population of Brussels is massacred over allegations of host desecration. It was an end of the Hebrew community in Brussels. The event was commemorated by local Christians as the Sacrament of Miracle.

1376
Jews are expelled from Hungary. Most of them flee south into Greece and neighboring areas.

1377
Another Host desecration trial is held against Jews in Teruel and Huesca. The person behind it, as with the previous trial, is the crown prince Don Juan of Aragon. Many Jews are tortured and burned alive publicly.

1382
16 Jews are murdered in Paris the Mailotin Riots after the Harelle.

1384
200 Jews are killed in Noerdlingen and the community ceases to exist.

1385
Wenceslaus, Holy Roman Emperor, arrests the Jews from the Swabian League and confiscates their property.

1385
John of Castile reinforces previous anti-Jewish legislation.

1389
18 March, a Jewish boy is accused of plotting against a priest. The mob slaughters approx. 3,000 of Prague's Jews, destroys the city's synagogue and Jewish cemetery. Wenceslaus insists that the responsibility lay with the Jews for going outside during Holy Week.

1391
Anti-Jewish riots led by Ferrand Martinez erupt in Seville.

1391
Led by Ferrand Martinez, countless massacres devastate the Sephardic Jewish community, especially in Castile, Valencia, Catalonia and Aragon. The Jewish quarter in Barcelona is completely destroyed. By the end of the pogroms, at least 10,000 Jews are murdered and thousands more are forcibly converted.

1391
Pogrom against the Jews of Toledo on the Seventeenth of Tammuz. Jewish martyrs Israel Alnaqua and Judah ben Asher died at the stake together.

1391
Over 250 Jews are massacred by a mob in Valencia.

1391
All Jewish inhabitants of Palma de Mallorca are either converted or killed.

1391
More than 400 Jews are massacred in Barcelona.

1392
Jews expelled from Bern, Switzerland. Although between 1408 and 1427 Jews were again residing in the city, the only Jews to appear in Bern subsequently were transients, chiefly physicians and cattle dealers

1392
The Jews of Damascus are accused by Muslims of setting fire to the central mosque. Although there was no evidence presented, one Jew was burned alive, the leaders of the community were tortured, and the local synagogue was appropriated into a mosque.

1392
Sicilian Jews are forced to live in Ghettos and severe persecution breaks out in Erice, Catania and Syracuse.

1394
3 November, Charles VI of France expels all Jews from France.

1397
Jewish ghettos of Radgona and Ptuj in Slovenia are set on fire by an anonymous mob.

1399
A Christian woman is accused of stealing hosts and giving them to Jews for the purpose of desecration. Thirteen members of the Jewish community of Posen, along with the woman are all tortured and burned alive slowly. This story, however, does not appear until the latter half of the 14th century. The community is then forced to pay a special tax every year until the 18th century.

1399
80 Jews are murdered in Prague after a converted Jew named Peter accuses them of denigrating Christianity. A number of Jews are also jailed, including Yom-Tov Lipmann-Muhlhausen.

== Fifteenth century ==
1401
Two Jews are burned to death for an alleged host desecration in Glogau.

1404
Many members of the Jewish community of Salzburg and Hallein is burned alive on charged of host desecration.

1407
Blood libel accusations against the Jews of Kraków led by a fanatic priest result in anti-Jewish riots.

1411
Oppressive legislation against Jews in Spain as an outcome of the preaching of the Dominican friar Vicente Ferrer.

1413
Disputation of Tortosa, Spain, staged by the Avignon Pope Benedict XIII, is followed by forced mass conversions.

1418
All Jews living in Trier are expelled.

1420
All Jews are expelled from Lyon.

1421
Persecutions of Jews in Vienna, known as Wiener Gesera (Vienna Edict), confiscation of their possessions, and forced conversion of Jewish children. 270 Jews burned at stake. and all Viennese Jews are expelled following persecution.

1422
Pope Martin V issues a Bull reminding Christians that Christianity was derived from Judaism and warns the friars not to incite against the Jews. The Bull was withdrawn the following year on allegations that the Jews of Rome attained it by fraud.

1424
The Jewish population of Zurich is exiled.

1424
Jews are expelled and banned from Cologne.

1426
Jews are expelled from Iglau after they are accused of being in league with the Hussites.

1427
All Jews living in Bern are expelled and their property is seized.

1428
Jews are expelled from Fribourg.

1430
Pogrom in Aix-en-Provence breaks out in which 9 Jews are killed, many more are injured and 74 are forcibly converted.

1434
Council of Basel, Sessio XIX, forbids Jews to obtain academic degrees and to act as agents in the conclusion of contracts between Christians.

1435
Massacre and forced conversion of Mallorcan Jews.

1435
Jews are expelled from Speyer.

1436
Jews of Zurich are expelled.

1438
Jewish inhabitants of Düsseldorf are expelled.

1438
Establishment of mellahs (ghettos) in Morocco.

1440
Jews of Augsburg expelled

1442
Synagogues and other Jewish buildings are destroyed by a riot of Glogau.

1442
Jews are expelled from Upper Bavaria.

1444
Jewish population of Utrecht are expelled.

1447
Casimir IV renews all the rights of Jews of Poland and makes his charter one of the most liberal in Europe. He revokes it in 1454 at the insistence of Bishop Zbigniew.

1449
The Statute of Toledo introduces the rule of purity of blood discriminating Conversos. Pope Nicholas V condemns it.

1450
Louis IX, Duke of Bavaria expels all Jews who reject baptism.

1453
Around 40 Jews in Breslau are burned at the stake on charges of host desecration, while the head Rabbi hung himself to avoid the torture. Jewish children under 7 were stolen and forcibly baptized. The few Jews remaining were banished from Breslau.

1456
Pope Caliextus III issues a papal bull which prohibits Jews from testifying against Christians, but permits Christians to testify against a Jew.

1458
The city council of Erfurt, Germany votes to expel the Jews.

1463
Pope Nicholas V authorizes the establishment of the Inquisition to investigate heresy among the Marranos. See also Crypto-Judaism.

1464
Over 30 Jews in Cracow are killed by an angry mob.

1465
The Moroccan revolt against the Marinid dynasty, accusations against one Jewish Vizier lead to a massacre of the entire Jewish population of Fes.

1467
Jews of Tlemcen persecuted and many flee for Castile.

1468
Many Jewish homes and plundered and a number are killed during anti-Jewish in Posen.

1468
Sultan Qaitbay forces Jews of Cairo to pay 75,000 gold pieces or be expelled. This severely impoverished the local Jewish community.

1470
The Jewish community of Bavaria are expelled, many migrate into Bulgaria.

1473
Massacres of Marranos of Valladolid, Cordova, Segovia, Ciudad Real, Spain

1474
On Assumption day 15 August 1474, Christians wreaked brutal havoc on the Jewish dwellers of the Cartellone area of Modica. It was the first and most horrible massacre of Sicilian Jews. During the evening a number of Christians slaughtered about 360 Jews causing a total and fierce devastation in La Giudecca. They ran through the streets chanting: "Hurrah for Mary! Death to the Jews!" (Viva Maria! Morte ai Giudei!).

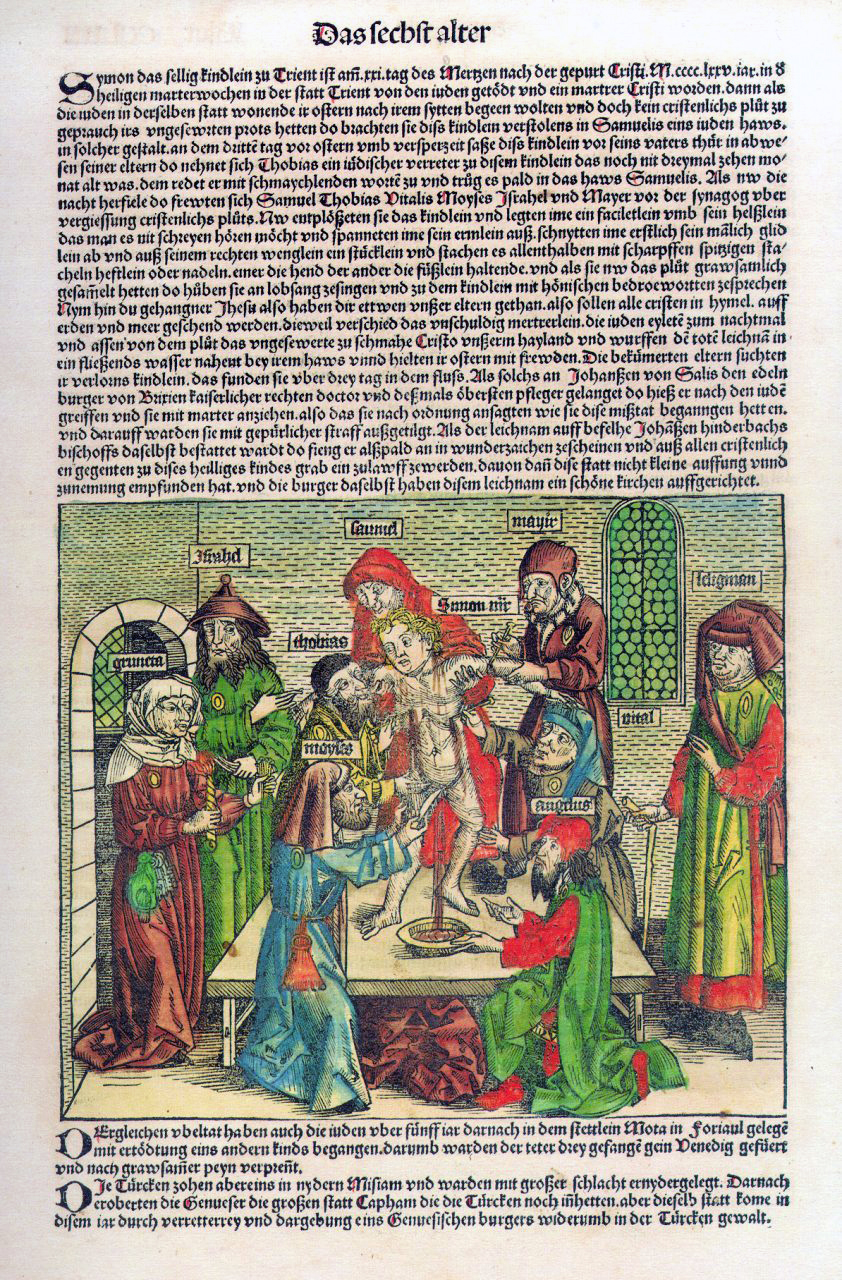
Simon of Trent blood libel. Illustration in Hartmann Schedel's Weltchronik, 1493

1475
A student of the preacher Giovanni da Capistrano, Franciscan Bernardine of Feltre, accuses the Jews in murdering an infant, Simon. The entire community is arrested, 15 leaders are burned at the stake, the rest are expelled. In 1588, Pope Sixtus V confirmed Simon's cultus. Saint Simon was considered a martyr and patron of kidnap and torture victims for almost 500 years. In 1965, Pope Paul VI declared the episode a fraud, and decanonized Simon's sainthood.

1478
Jews of Passau are expelled.

1481
The Spanish Inquisition is instituted.

1484
Pogrom against the Jewish section of Arles. A number of Jews are killed and 50 men are forced to convert.

1487–1504
Archbishop Gennady of Novgorod exposes the heresy of Zhidovstvuyushchiye (Judaizers) in Eastern Orthodoxy of Muscovy.

1490
Tomás de Torquemada burns 6,000 volumes of Jewish manuscripts in Salamanca.

1490
Jews are expelled from Geneva and not allowed to return for over 300 years.

1491
The blood libel in La Guardia, Spain, where the alleged victim Holy Child of La Guardia became revered as a saint.

1491
Muhammad al-Maghili orders the expulsion and murder of the Jewish community in Tlemcen.

1492
The Jewish population of Tuat is massacred in a pogrom inspired by the preacher al-Maghili.

1492
Ferdinand II and Isabella issue General Edict on the Expulsion of the Jews from Spain: approx. 200,000. Some return to the Land of Israel. As many localities and entire countries expel their Jewish citizens (after robbing them), and others deny them entrance, the legend of the Wandering Jew, a condemned harbinger of calamity, gains popularity.

1492
Jews of Mecklenburg, Germany are accused of stabbing a consecrated wafer. 27 Jews are burned, including two women. The spot is still called the Judenberg. All the Jews are expelled from the Duchy.

1492
Askia Mohammad I decrees that all Jews must convert to Islam, leave or be killed. Judaism becomes illegal in Mali. This was based on the advice of Muhammad al-Maghili. The region of Timbuktu had previously been tolerant of other religions before Askia got into power.

1493
John II of Portugal deports several hundred Jewish children to the colony of São Tomé, where most of them die.

1493
Expulsion from Sicily: approx. 37,000.

1493-97
The Jews in Persia and Afghanistan were forced into mellahs. They were not permitted to have any businesses outside the walls of the mellah.

1494
Jews of Thurgau attacked.

1494
16 Jews are burned at the stake after a blood libel in Trnava.

1494
After a fire destroys the Jewish quarter of Cracow, the Polish king Jan I Olbracht transfers the Jews to Kazimierz, which would become the first Polish ghetto. Jews were confined to the ghetto until 1868.

1495
Jews in Lithuania are expelled and their property is seized. They were allowed to return 8 years later.

1495
The Jews of Lecce are massacred and the Jewish quarter is burned to the ground.

1495
The Spanish conquer Naples and the Jews are officially expelled, though the order is not carried out.

1496
Jews living in Styria are expelled and all their property is confiscated.

1496
Forced conversion and expulsion of Jews from Portugal. This included many who fled Spain four years earlier.

1497
Entire Jewish community of Graz is expelled.

1497
Manuel I of Portugal decrees that all Jews must convert or leave Portugal without their children.

1498
Prince Alexander of Lithuania forces most of the Jews to forfeit their property or convert. The main motivation is to cancel the debts the nobles owe to the Jews. Within a short time trade grinds to a halt and the Prince invites the Jews back in.

1499
Jews of Nuremberg are expelled.

1499
Jews are banished from Verona. The Jews who were money lenders were replaced with Christian usurers who oppressed the poor so bad that the Jews were very shortly called to return.

1499
All New Christians are prohibited from leaving Portugal, even those who were forcibly baptized.

== Sixteenth century ==
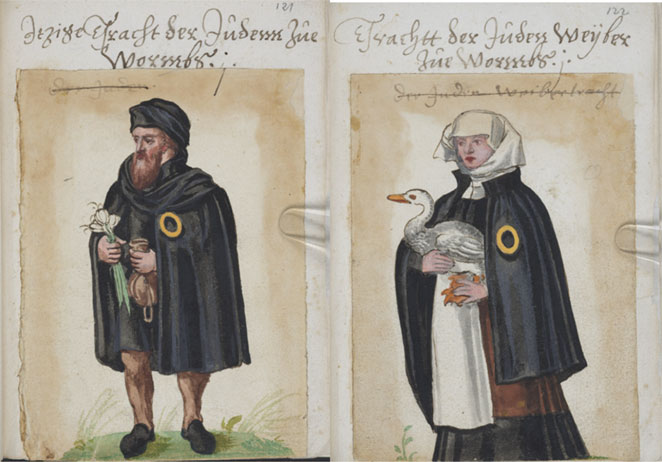
Jews from Worms, Germany wear the mandatory yellow badge. A moneybag and garlic in the hands are an antisemitic stereotype (sixteenth-century drawing).

1501
French Jews living in Provence are expelled.

1504
Jews living in Pilsen are expelled on charges of host desecration.

1504
Several Jewish scholars are burned at the stake for proselytizing in Moscow.

1505
Ten České Budějovice Jews are tortured and executed after being accused of killing a Christian girl; later, on his deathbed, a shepherd confesses to fabricating the accusation.

1506
A marrano expresses his doubts about miracle visions at St. Dominics Church in Lisbon, Portugal. The crowd, led by Dominican friars, kills him, then ransacks Jewish houses and slaughters any Jew they could find. The countrymen hear about the massacre and join in. Over 2,000 marranos killed in three days.

1509
A converted Jew, Johannes Pfefferkorn, receives authority of Maximilian I, Holy Roman Emperor to destroy the Talmud and other Jewish religious books, except the Hebrew Bible, in Frankfurt.

1509
38 Jews of Spandau, Brandenburg, and Stendal are burned at the stake in Berlin, Germany for allegedly desecrating the host; remainder expelled from Brandenburg.

1510
23 November. Less-wealthy Jews expelled from Naples; remainder heavily taxed.

1510
Spanish gain control of Calabria and expel all Jews and New Christians.

1510
Spain gains control of Naples and expels the Jewish population.

1511
The officials of Conegliano try to expel the Jewish population but are unsuccessful.

1511
Ten Roman Catholic converts from Judaism burned at the stake in Palermo for allegedly reverting.

1511
Most Apulian Jews are either expelled or are tortured to death. Jewish property is seized and Synagogues are replaced with Catholic Churches.

1514
The Jewish population of Mittelberg is accused of host desecration.

1515
Emperor Maximillian expels Jews from Ljubljana.

1515
Jews are expelled from the city of Genoa, but are allowed back in a year later.

1516
The first ghetto is established, on one of the islands in Venice.

1517
1517 Hebron attacks: Jews are beaten, raped and killed in Hebron, as their homes and businesses are looted and pillaged.

1517
1517 Safed attacks: The Jews of Safed is attacked by Mamluk forces and local Arabs. Many Jews are killed and their homes are plundered.

1519
The Jewish community of Ratisbon is expelled. The synagogue is destroyed and replaced with a chapel. Thousands of Jewish gravestones are taken and used for buildings.

1519
Martin Luther leads Protestant Reformation and challenges the doctrine of Servitus Judaeorum "... to deal kindly with the Jews and to instruct them to come over to us". 21 February. All Jews expelled from Ratisbon/Regensburg.

1520
Pope Leo X allows the Jews to print the Talmud in Venice.

1523
The conquest of Cranganore by the Portuguese leads to the complete destruction of the local Jewish community. Most refugees fled to Cochin.

1523
Mexico bans immigration from those who cannot prove four generations of Catholic ancestry.

1524
After the death of Sultan Abu Abdallah al-Burtuqali several Jews in mellah of Fez were killed and mass looting happened and property was destroyed.

1526
Jews are expelled from Ofen, Esztergom, Pressburg, and Sopron following the Battle of Mohács.

1527
Jews are ordered to leave Florence, but the edict is soon rescinded.

1528
Three judaizers are burned at the stake in Mexico City's first auto da fe.

1529
30 Jewish men, women, and children are burned at the stake in Pezinok.

1532
Solomon Molcho is burned at the stake for refusing to return to Catholicism after reverting to Judaism.

1535
After Spanish troops capture Tunis all the local Jews are sold into slavery.

1539
Jews are expelled from Nauheim.

1539
Katarzyna Weiglowa, a Roman Catholic woman from the Kingdom of Poland who converted to Judaism is burned at the stake in Kraków under the charge of apostasy for refusing to call Jesus Christ the Son of God. She is regarded by Jews (among others) as a martyr.

1541
All Jews are banished from Prague.

1542
Moses Fishel of Cracow is accused of proselytizing and dies a martyr.

1543
Jews are exiled from Basel.

1543
Jeronimo Diaz, a New Christian physician, is burned at the stake for holding heretical opinions in Goa, India.

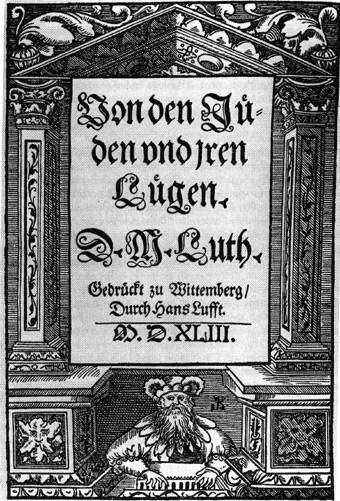
Bookcover of On the Jews and Their Lies

1543
In his pamphlet On the Jews and Their Lies Martin Luther advocates an eight-point plan to get rid of the Jews as a distinct group either by religious conversion or by expulsion:
"...set fire to their synagogues or schools..."
"...their houses also be razed and destroyed..."
"...their prayer books and Talmudic writings... be taken from them..."
"...their rabbis be forbidden to teach henceforth on pain of loss of life and limb..."
"...safe-conduct on the highways be abolished completely for the Jews..."
"...usury be prohibited to them, and that all cash and treasure of silver and gold be taken from them..." and "Such money should now be used in ... the following [way]... Whenever a Jew is sincerely converted, he should be handed [certain amount]..."
"...young, strong Jews and Jewesses [should]... earn their bread in the sweat of their brow..."
"If we wish to wash our hands of the Jews' blasphemy and not share in their guilt, we have to part company with them. They must be driven from our country" and "we must drive them out like mad dogs."

Luther "got the Jews expelled from Saxony in 1537, and in the 1540s he drove them from many German towns; he tried unsuccessfully to get the elector to expel them from Brandenburg in 1543. His followers continued to agitate against the Jews there: they sacked the Berlin synagogue in 1572 and the following year finally got their way, the Jews being banned from the entire country." (See also Martin Luther and the Jews)

1546
Martin Luther's sermon Admonition against the Jews contains accusations of ritual murder, black magic, and poisoning of wells. Luther recognizes no obligation to protect the Jews.

1547
Ivan the Terrible becomes ruler of Russia and refuses to allow Jews to live in or even enter his kingdom because they "bring about great evil" (quoting his response to request by Polish king Sigismund II).

1547
10 out of the 30 Jews living in Asolo are killed and their houses are robbed.

1550
Dr. Joseph Hacohen is chased out of Genoa for practicing medicine; soon all Jews are expelled.

1553
Following the Bragadin-Giustiniani dispute, the Roman Inquisition under the leadership of Cardinal Carafa (later Pope Paul IV) confiscated and burns all copies of the Talmud on Rosh Hashanah in Rome, starting a wave of Talmud burning throughout Italy. About 12,000 copies were destroyed.

1554
Cornelio da Montalcino, a Franciscan Friar who converted to Judaism, is burned alive in Rome.

1555
In papal bull Cum nimis absurdum, Pope Paul IV writes: "It appears utterly absurd and impermissible that the Jews, whom God has condemned to eternal slavery for their guilt, should enjoy our Christian love." He renews anti-Jewish legislation and installs a locked nightly ghetto in Rome. The Bull also forces Jewish males to wear a yellow hat, females – yellow kerchief. Owning real estate or practicing medicine on Christians is forbidden. It also limits Jewish communities to only one synagogue.

1555
The Martyrs of 1555. 25 Jews in Ancona are hanged or burned at the stake for refusing to convert to Christianity as a result of Pope Paul IV's Bull of 1555.

1556
A rumor is sent around that a poor woman in Sokhachev named Dorothy sold Jews the holy wafer received by her during communion, and that it was stabbed until it bled. The Bishop of Khelm accuses the local Jews, and eventually three Jews along with Dorothy Lazhentzka are arrested, put on the rack, and sentenced to death on charges of host desecration. They were burned at the stake. Before their death, the martyred Jews made a declaration:

"We have never stabbed the host, because we do not believe that the host is the Divine body, knowing that God has no body nor blood. We believe, as did our forefathers, that the Messiah is not God, but His messenger. We also know from experience that there can be no blood in flour."

1557
Seventy houses were burned in the ghetto of Prague. Jews are temporarily banished.

1558
Recanati, Italy: a baptized Jew, Joseph Paul More, enters synagogue on Yom Kippur under the protection of Pope Paul IV and tries to preach a conversion sermon. The congregation evicts him. Soon after, the Jews are expelled from Recanati.

1559
Pope Pius IV allows Talmud on conditions that it is printed by a Christian and the text is censored.

1560
The Goa Inquisition begins.

1561
Ferdinand I takes an oath to expel the Jews. Mordechai Zemach runs to Rome and convinces Pope Pius IV to cancel the decree.

1563
Russian troops take Polotsk from Lithuania, Jews are given ultimatum: embrace Russian Orthodox Church or die. Around 300 Jewish men, women and children were thrown into ice holes of Dvina river.

1564
Brest-Litovsk: the son of a wealthy Jewish tax collector is accused of killing the family's Christian servant for ritual purposes. He is tortured and executed in line with the law. King Sigismund II of Poland forbids future charges of ritual murder, calling them groundless.

1566
Antonio Ghislieri elected and, as Pope Pius V, reinstates the harsh anti-Jewish laws of Pope Paul IV.

1567
Jews are allowed to live in France.

1567
Jews expelled from Republic of Genoa.

1569
Pope Pius V expels all the Jews of Bologna. He then gave their cemetery away to the nuns of Saint Peter, who destroyed it to use the land.

1569
Pope Pius V expels Jews dwelling outside of the ghettos of Rome, Ancona, and Avignon from the Papal States, thus ensuring that they remain city-dwellers.

1571
Jews in Berlin are forced to leave and their property is confiscated.

1571
The Mexican Inquisition begins.

1574
First auto-da-fé in Mexico.

1576
Deportation of Jews from Safed to Cyprus by Ottoman authorities.

1581
Pope Gregory XIII issues a Bull which prohibits the use of Jewish doctors.

1583
Three Portuguese conversos are burned at the stake in Rome.

1586
Pope Sixtus V forbids printing of the Talmud.

1590
Jewish quarter of Mikulov (Nikolsburg) burns to ground and 15 people die while Christians watch or pillage.

1590
King Philip II of Spain orders expulsion of Jews from Lombardy. His order is ignored by local authorities until 1597, when 72 Jewish families are forced into exile.

1591
Philip II, King of Spain, banished all Jews from the duchy of Milan.

1592
Esther Chiera is executed with one of her sons by the Sultan Murad III's calvary.

1593
Pope Clement VIII confirms the papal bull of Paul III that expels Jews from papal states except ghettos in Rome and Ancona and issues Caeca et obdurata ("Blind Obstinacy"): "All the world suffers from the usury of the Jews, their monopolies and deceit. ... Then as now Jews have to be reminded intermittently anew that they were enjoying rights in any country since they left Palestine and the Arabian desert, and subsequently their ethical and moral doctrines as well as their deeds rightly deserve to be exposed to criticism in whatever country they happen to live."

1593
At least 900 are expelled from Bologna.

1595
10 people are accused of practicing Judaism in Lima, Peru. Four of them are released and one named Francisco Rodríguez, is burned alive.

1596
Francisca Nuñez de Carabajal was a Marrana (Jewish convert to Christianity) in New Spain executed by the Inquisition for "judaizing" in 1596. One of her children, Isabel, in her twenties at the time, was tortured until she implicated the whole of the Carabajal family. The whole family was forced to confess and abjure at a public auto-da-fé, celebrated on Saturday, 24 February 1590. Luis de Carabajal the younger (one of Francisca's sons), along with Francisca and four of her daughters, was condemned to perpetual imprisonment, and another one of Francisca's sons, Baltasar, who had fled upon the first warning of danger, was, along with his deceased father Francisco Rodriguez de Matos, burnt in effigy. In January 1595, Francisca and her children were accused of a relapse into Judaism and convicted. During their imprisonment they were tempted to communicate with one another on Spanish pear seeds, on which they wrote touching messages of encouragement to remain true to their faith. At the resulting auto-da-fé, Francisca and her children Isabel, Catalina, Leonor, and Luis, died at the stake, together with Manuel Diaz, Beatriz Enriquez, Diego Enriquez, and Manuel de Lucena. Of her other children, Mariana, who lost her reason for a time, was tried and put to death at an auto-da-fé held in Mexico City on 25 March 1601; Anica, the youngest child, being "reconciled" at the same time.

1598
3 Jews in Lublin are brutally tortured and executed by quartering, after a Christian boy is found in a nearby swamp.

== Seventeenth century ==
1600
14 Judaizers are punished in Lima, Peru.

1603
Frei Diogo da Assumpcão, a partly Jewish friar who embraced Judaism, burned alive in Lisbon.

1605
16 Judaizers are arrested in Lima, Peru.

1608
The Jesuit order forbids admission to anyone descended from Jews to the fifth generation, a restriction lifted in the 20th century. Three years later Pope Paul V applies the rule throughout the Church, but his successor revokes it.

1612
The Hamburg Senate decides to officially allow Jews to live in Hamburg on the condition there is no public worship.

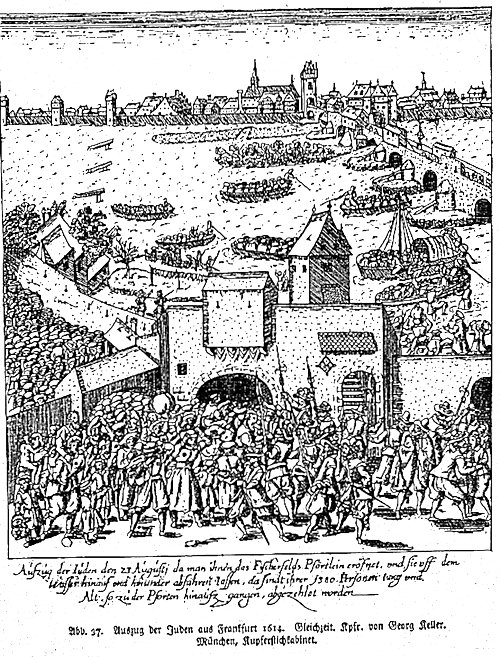
Expulsion of the Jews from Frankfurt on 23 August 1614: "1380 persons old and young were counted at the exit of the gate"

1614
Vincent Fettmilch, who called himself the "new Haman of the Jews", leads a raid on the Frankfurt Jewish quarter that turned into an attack that destroyed the whole community.

1615
The Guild led by Dr. Chemnitz, "non-violently" forced the Jews from Worms.

1616
Jesuits arrive in Grodno and accuse the Jews of host desecration and blood libel.

1618
Antisemitic pamphlet Mirror of the Polish Crown is published by professor Sebastian Miczyński. It accuses the Jews of murder, sacrileges, witchcraft, and urges their expulsion. It would go on to inspire anti-Jewish riots across Poland.

1619
Shah Abbas I of the Persian Sufi dynasty increases persecution against the Jews, forcing many to outwardly practice Islam. Many keep practicing Judaism in secret.

1622
King Christian IV invites Jews to come and live in Denmark.

1624
Ghetto established in Ferrara, Italy.

1624
Christian theologian Antonio Homem is burned at the stake for pursuing Judaism.

1625
Jews of Vienna forced to live in a ghetto in Leopoldstadt.

1628
Roman Jewish mistress of the son of the duke of Parma is burned alive.

1630
Jewish merchant Moses the Braider is burned alive after being accused of host desecration.

1631
Due to awful conditions in the Jewish Ghetto of Padua, 421 out of the 721 Jews living in the ghetto perish.

1632
King Ladislaus IV of Poland forbids antisemitic books and printings.

1632
Shortly after Miguel Rodriguez is discovered holding onto Jewish rites, an Auto-da-fé is held in the presence of the King and Queen. Miguel and his wife Isabel Alvarez, and 5 others are burned alive publicly.

1632, 20 April
Jewish-convert and martyr Nicolas Antoine is burned at the stake for heresy.

1633
Jews are banned from Radom.

1635
Anti-Jewish riots take place in Vilna.

1637
Four Jews are publicly tortured and executed in Kraków.

1639
Over 60 Judaizers are burned at the stake at an Auto-da-fé in Lima, Peru. Among those martyred was physician Francisco Maldonado de Silva.

1639
Two Roman Jewish children are forcibly baptized by Pope Urban VIII.

1639
Jews of Łęczyca are accused of ritual murder after a young child is found dead in the woods. The blame falls on the Jews after a local gentile named Foma confesses to the crime then says he had been coerced into doing it by the Jews. Despite the lack of evidence, two Jewish elders named Meyer and Lazar are arrested and tortured, and eventually quartered publicly.

1644
Jewish martyr Judah the Believer is burned at the stake as he recites prayers in Hebrew.

1647
Jewish martyr Isaac de Castro Tartas is burned at the stake while he recites the Shema along with 6 other Jews.

1648–1655
The Ukrainian Cossacks led by Bohdan Chmielnicki massacre about 100,000 Jews and similar number of Polish nobles, 300 Jewish communities destroyed.

1649
Largest Auto-da-fé in the New World. 109 victims, 13 were burned alive and 57 in effigy.

1655
Oliver Cromwell readmits Jews to England.

1656
All Jews are expelled from Isfahan because of the common belief of their impurity. The ones who stay are forced to convert to Islam.

1657–1662
Jews throughout Iran (including 7,000 in Kashan alone) are forced to convert to Islam as a result of persecutions by Abbas II of Persia.

1661
Sephardic poet Antonio Enríquez Gómez is publicly burned in effigy in Seville.

1663
Two Christian Janissaries accuse the Jews of Istanbul of killing a child who had actually been killed by his own father. After killing his own son, he threw his body onto the Jewish quarter in order to implicate the Jews in the crime. Once the Grand Vizier learned the facts of the case from his spies stationed in the Greek quarter, he informed the Sultan and the Janissaries were put to death. 20 Jews were killed in total by the Greek mobs.

1664 May
Jews of Lemberg (now Lviv) ghetto organize self-defense against impending assault by students of Jesuit seminary and Cathedral school. The militia sent by the officials to restore order, instead joined the attackers. About 100 Jews killed.

1669
The majority of Jews in Oran are expelled by the Spanish queen.

1670
Jews expelled from Vienna.

1670
Raphael Levy is burned at the stake over blood libel. After being offered a chance to convert and live, he declared that he had lived a Jew and would die a Jew.

1679
The Exile of Mawza. It is considered the single most traumatic event experienced collectively by the Jews of Yemen. All Jews living in nearly all cities and towns throughout Yemen were banished by decree of the king, Imām al-Mahdi Ahmad, and sent to a dry and barren region of the country named Mawza to withstand their fate or to die. Only a few communities who lived in the far eastern quarters of Yemen were spared this fate by virtue of their Arab patrons who refused to obey the King's orders. Many would die along the route and while confined to the hot and arid conditions of this forbidding terrain.

1680
Auto-da-fé in Madrid.

1681
Mob attacks against Jews in Vilna. It was condemned by King John Sobieski, who ordered the punishment of the guilty.

1682
Largest trial against alleged Judaizers in Lisbon, Portugal. 117 were tried in 3 days.

1683
Hungarian rebels known as Kuruc rushes into the town of Uherský Brod, massacring the majority of its Jewish inhabitants. Most of the victims were recent refugees who were expelled from Vienna in 1670. One of the Hebrews killed by the mob was Jewish historian Nathan ben Moses Hannover, who was a survivor of the Chmielnicki massacres. Most of the survivors fled to Upper Hungary.

1684
Attack on the Jewish ghetto of Buda.

1686
Only 500 Jews survive after Austrian sieged the city of Buda. Half of them are sold into slavery.

1689
Worms is invaded by the French and the Jewish quarter is reduced to ashes.

1691
219 people are convicted of being Jewish in Palma de Mallorca. 37 of them are burned to death. Among those martyred is Raphael and his sister Catalina Benito, who although declaring she wanted to live, jumped right into the flames rather than to be baptized.

1696
A number of Converso Jews are burned alive in Évora, Portugal.

1698
A female child is found dead at a church in Sandomierz. The mother of the child first said she placed her body in the church because she could not afford a burial, but after torture accused the Jewish leader Aaron Berek of the local community of murdering her daughter. The mother and Berek were sentenced the death.

1699
A mob attacks the Jewish Quarter of Bamberg but runs away after one Jew stops them by pouring baskets of ripe plums on the attackers. The event is still commemorated on the 29th of Nisan as the Zwetschgen-Ta'anit (Prune-Fest).

== Eighteenth century ==
1703
The Aleinu prayer is prohibited in most of Germany.

1706
An outbreak of the plague and a terrible famine in Algiers reduced many Jewish families to indigence. Then, influenced by false accusations, the bey imposed an exorbitant fine on the community and ordered the destruction of the synagogues, which were saved only by the payment of a further sum. This ruined the majority of the Jews.

1711
Johann Andreas Eisenmenger writes his Entdecktes Judenthum ("Judaism Unmasked"), a work denouncing Judaism and which had a formative influence on modern antisemitic polemics.

1712
Blood libel in Sandomierz and expulsion of the town's Jews.

1715
Elector Max Emanuel orders the deportation of all Jews living in Bavaria.

1717
All Jews living in Gibraltar are expelled.

1718
The last Jews of Carniola, Styria and Carinthia are expelled.

1721
Arab creditors set fire to an Ashkenazi synagogue, fed up with debts. Ashkenazi Jews are banned from Jerusalem along with anyone who looks like an Ashkenazi Jew. Some Ashkenazim dressed up like Sephardic Jews in order to fool the authorities.

1721
Maria Barbara Carillo was burned at the stake for heresy during the Spanish Inquisition. She was executed at the age of 95 or 96 and is the oldest person known to have been executed at the instigation of the Inquisition. Carillo was sentenced to death for heresy for returning to her faith in Judaism.

1724
Jews of Radom are exiled.

1727
Edict of Catherine I of Russia: "The Jews... who are found in Ukraine and in other Russian provinces are to be expelled at once beyond the frontiers of Russia."

1734
The Haidamaks, paramilitary bands in Polish Ukraine, attack Jews.

1736
María Francisca Ana de Castro, called La bella toledana, a Spanish immigrant to Peru, was arrested in 1726, accused of "judaizing" (being a practicing Jew). She was burned at the stake after an auto de fe in 1736. This event was a major spectacle in Lima, but it raised questions about possible irregular procedures and corruption within the Inquisition.

1737
Blood libel in Jarosław leads to Jews being tortured and others being put to death.

1742
Elizabeth of Russia issues a decree of expulsion of all the Jews out of Ukraine. Her resolution to the Senate's appeal regarding harm to the trade: "I don't desire any profits from the enemies of Christ". One of the deportees is Antonio Ribera Sanchez, her own personal physician and the head of army's medical dept.

1743
The Russians gain control of Riga and all local Jews are expelled.

1744
Frederick II The Great (a "heroic genius", according to Hitler) limits Breslau to ten "protected" Jewish families, on the grounds that otherwise they will "transform it into complete Jerusalem". He encourages this practice in other Prussian cities. In 1750 he issues Revidiertes General Privilegium und Reglement vor die Judenschaft: "protected" Jews had an alternative to "either abstain from marriage or leave Berlin" (Simon Dubnow).

1744
Archduchess of Austria Maria Theresa orders: "... no Jew is to be tolerated in our inherited duchy of Bohemia" by the end of Feb. 1745. In December 1748 she reverses her position, on condition that Jews pay for readmission every ten years. This extortion was known among the Jews as malke-geld (queen's money). In 1752 she introduces the law limiting each Jewish family to one son.

1746
The city of Radom bans Jews from entering.

1753
The Jewish community of Kaunas is expelled.

1755
Jeronimo Jose Ramos, a merchant from Bragança, Portugal, is burned at the stake for being secretly Jewish.

1761
Several Jews from Alsace are executed after being accused of host desecration.

1761
The Jews of Kaunas are expelled after anti-Jewish riots.

1762
Rhode Island refuses to grant Jews citizenship stating "no person who is not of the Christian religion can be admitted free to this colony."

1766
All but 6 Jews are expelled from Toruń.

1768
Haidamak Cossacks massacre the Jews of Uman in Ukraine.

1775
Pope Pius VI issues a severe Editto sopra gli ebrei (Edict concerning the Jews). Previously lifted restrictions are reimposed, Judaism is suppressed

1775
A blood libel spread in Hebron, in which Jews were falsely accused of murdering the son of a local sheikh. Mob attacks took place. At first the Sheikh demanded to kill all the Jews but after pleas settled on a large fine that nearly destroyed the community.

1776
The Jewish community of Basra is massacred.

1782
Holy Roman Emperor Joseph II abolishes most of persecution practices in Toleranzpatent on condition that Yiddish and Hebrew are eliminated from public records and judicial autonomy is annulled. Judaism is branded "quintessence of foolishness and nonsense". Moses Mendelssohn writes: "Such a tolerance... is even more dangerous play in tolerance than open persecution".

1783
The Sultan expels the Moroccan Jews for failing to pay an exorbitant ransom.

1785
Ali Burzi Pasha murders hundreds of Libyan Jews.

1786
Jews are expelled from Jeddah, most of them flee to Yemen.

1790
Yazid becomes the Sultan of Morocco and immediately orders troops to massacre and plunder the Jewish quarter of Tétouan.

1790
The Touro Synagogue's warden, Moses Seixas, wrote to George Washington, expressing his support for Washington's administration and good wishes for him. Washington sent a letter in response, which read in part:

"... the Government of the United States ... gives to bigotry no sanction, to persecution no assistance. ... May the children of the Stock of Abraham, who dwell in this land, continue to merit and enjoy the good will of the other Inhabitants; while every one shall sit in safety under his own vine and figtree, and there shall be none to make him afraid. May the father of all mercies scatter light and not darkness in our paths, and make us all in our several vocations useful here, and in his own due time and way everlastingly happy."

— Letter of George Washington to the Hebrew Congregation in Newport, Rhode Island

There is an annual event reading Washington's letter, and speakers at the annual event have included Supreme Court Justices Ruth Bader Ginsburg and Elena Kagan; and Brown University Presidents Ruth Simmons and Christina Paxson.

1790, 20 May
Eleazer Solomon is quartered for the alleged murder of a Christian girl in Grodno.

1790–1792
Destruction of most of the Jewish communities of Morocco.

1791
Catherine II of Russia confines Jews to the Pale of Settlement and imposes them with double taxes.

1797
Napoleon calls for the end of Jewish segregation, ghettoization and the denial of equal rights.

== Twentieth century ==
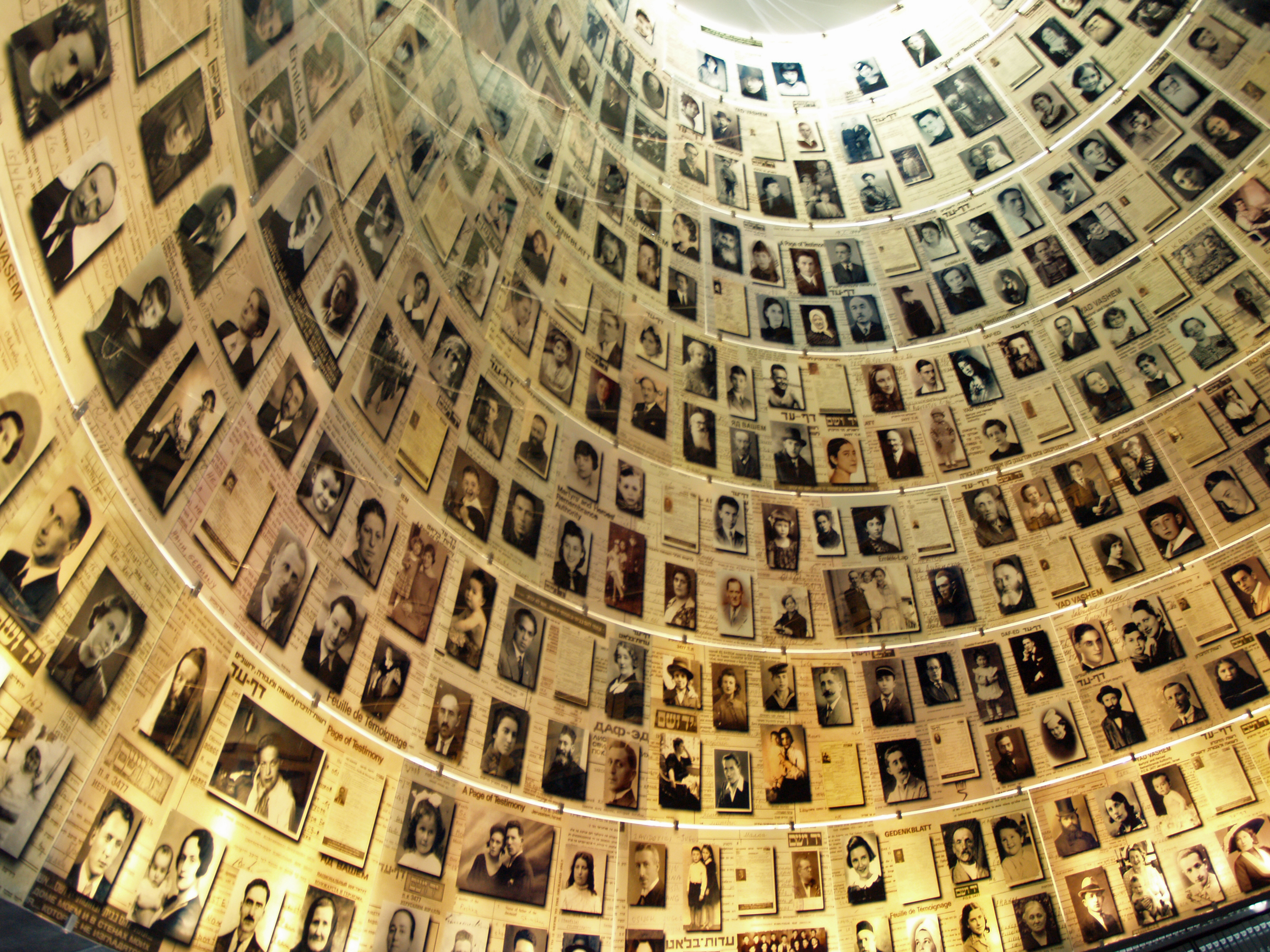
The Hall of Names in Yad Vashem contains Pages of Testimonies which commemorate the millions of Jews who were murdered during the Holocaust

== See also ==
- Martyrdom in Judaism
- Timeline of anti-Zionism
- Timeline of Jewish history
- Timeline of the Holocaust
- Vichy Holocaust collaboration timeline
- Timeline of the Arab–Israeli conflict
- Timeline of the Israeli–Palestinian conflict
- Expulsions and exoduses of Jews
- Jewish refugees
- Persecution of Jews

== Bibliography ==
- Flannery, Edward H. (1985). The Anguish of the Jews: Twenty-three Centuries of Antisemitism. Paulist Press. ISBN 978-0-8091-4324-5.
