= Maimun =

Maymun, Maymoon, Maymoun (Arabic: ميمون maymūn) is an Arabic male given name generally implies "showing signs of future success" and also means "blessed, favorable, bringing happiness, of good omen, prosperous, auspicious, promising, blissful".

It may refer to:

== People ==
- ʾAbū ʿImrān Mūsā bin Maymūn bin ʿUbaidallāh ʾal-Qurṭubī ʾal-ʾIsrāʾīlī (1135–1204), Spanish rabbi, physician, and philosopher
- Maimun Najar (15th century), Spanish/Algerian rabbi
  - Nathan (bin Maymūn) Najar (15th century), a rabbi at Constantine, Algeria
- A'sha Maymūn Ibn Qays (c. 570 - 629), an Arabic Jahiliyyah poet
- Amr ibn Maymūn al-Awdi, one of the Ansar companions of the Islamic prophet Muhammad

== Places ==
- Maimun, Iran, a village in Yazd Province, Iran
- Bani Maymun, a village in western central Yemen
- Istana Maimun ("Maimun Palace or Maimoon Palace"), a well-known landmark at Medan, North Sumatra
- Maimun Saleh Airport, a small airstrip in Sabang, Pulau Weh, Indonesia

== See also ==
- Üç Maymun, a 2008 Turkish film
- Maimon
- Maiman
