= Kinnui =

Secular or vernacular name user by Jewish people in the diaspora

A kinnui (כנוי) or kinui (translated as "nickname") is the secular name held by Jewish people in relation to the language spoken by the country they reside in, differing from their Hebrew name.

The religious name is in the Hebrew language (for example, Moses ben Maimon; Joseph ben Gershon; Shlomeh Arieh ben David HaLevi; Gershom ben Judah; Devorah bat Avraham) and the secular name is in whatever language is in use in the geographic locality (for example, Isaiah Berlin; Solomon Lyon Barnard; Sigmund Freud; Golda Meir; Etta Cone).

== History ==
When Jews arrived in a new country, a secular name was often chosen from the local language. In Central and Eastern Europe, Yiddish was the secular language, so a Hebrew name was used in religious and Jewish community contexts and a Yiddish name (the kinnui) was used in secular contexts. In France, the secular name was in French; in Spain in Spanish and other vernacular languages, in North Africa and the Middle East in Arabic, in ancient Babylon, the kinnui was in Babylonian and so on. Some kinnuyim (the Hebrew plural of kinnui) sound similar to the corresponding Hebrew name, for example Mendel for Menachem, Anshel for Asher. A few kinnuyim are based on the animal-like attributes of four of the sons of Jacob and one of his grandsons: Judah, the lion (cf. the family name Lyon, Loewe); Benjamin, the wolf (cf. the family name Woolf); Naphtali, the deer (cf. the family names Hirsch, Hersch, Harris); and Issachar, the donkey (or the bear) (cf. the family names Bar, Baer, Barell, Barnard, Bernhardt, Berthold, Schulter); plus Ephraim, the fish (cf. the family name Fish).

Among Arabic-speaking Jews, Arabic names were adopted, such as Ḥassan, Abdallah, Sahl; or Hebrew names were translated into Arabic, for example, Eleazar into Mansur, Ovadia into Abdallah, Matzliah into Maimun. Ibn, analogous to the Hebrew ben, was used to form a family name. Examples of this formula are Ibn Aknin, Ibn Danan, Ibn Laṭif. In the Jews of Arab lands a linguistic mixing happened and names appear with both Hebrew and Arabic elements in the same name, for example, Abraham ibn Ezra. A peculiarity of the Arabic names is the kunya, the by-name given to a father after the birth of his son, by which the father is named after the son (using the prefix "Abu"). For example, Abu Yunus is a kunya for the father of a son named Jonah. "Abu" also forms family names, as in the case of Abudarham or Abulafia. The Arabic article "al" appears in quite a number of names, as in Al-Ḥarisi.

== Usage ==
The secular name is the name that appears in civil documents. The "shem hakodesh" usually appears only in connection with Jewish religious observances, for example, a record of circumcision (brit), in a marriage contract (ketubah), a writ of divorce (get) or on a memorial stone. Often, both names appear together, e.g. Menachem Mendel, Jehuda Leib.

== See also ==
- Kunya (Arabic)
- Jewish name change
