= Saidman =

Saidman is a surname. Notable people with the surname include:

- Aaron Saidman (born 1974), American filmmaker and television producer
- Jean Saidman (1897–1949), Romanian-French solar therapist

== See also ==
- Maidman
- Sandman (surname)
