= Hebrew name =

A Hebrew name is a name of Hebrew origin. In a more narrow meaning, it is a name used by Jews in a religious context and different from an individual's secular name for everyday use.

Names with Hebrew origins, especially those from the Hebrew Bible, are commonly used by Jews and Christians. Many are also used by Muslims, particularly those names mentioned in the Qur'an; for example, Ibrahim is a common Arabic name from the Hebrew Avraham. A Hebrew name can have many different variants, having been adapted to the phonologies and orthographies of many different languages.

A common practice among the Jewish diaspora is to give a Hebrew name to a child that is used in religious contexts throughout that person's lifetime.

Not all Hebrew names are strictly Hebrew in origin; some names may have been borrowed from other ancient languages, including from Egyptian, Aramaic, Phoenician, or Canaanite.

== Names of Hebrew origin ==
Hebrew names used by Jews (along with many Hebrew names used in Christendom) often come from the Tanakh, also known as the Hebrew Bible (the Christian version of which is called the Old Testament).

Many of these names are thought to have been adapted from Hebrew phrases and expressions, bestowing special meaning or the unique circumstances of birth to the one who receives that name.

Theophoric names are those which include a form of a divine name, such by adding the suffix ־אל -el, meaning "God", forming names such as מיכאל Michael ("who is like God?") and גבריאל Gabriel ("man of God"). Another common form of theophory is the use of the Tetragrammaton YHWH as the basis for a suffix; the most common abbreviations used by Jews are ־יה -yāh/-iyyāh and ־יהו -yāhû/-iyyāhû/-ayhû, forming names such as ישׁעיהו Yəšaʻªyāhû (Isaiah), צדקיהו Ṣiḏqiyyāhû (Zedekiah) and שׂריה Śərāyāh (Seraiah). Most Christian usage is of the shorter suffix preferred in translations of the Bible to European languages: Greek -ιας -ias and English -iah, producing names such as Τωβίας Tōbias (Tobias, Toby) instead of Tobiyyahu and Ἰερεμίας Ieremias (Jeremiah, Jeremy) instead of Yirmeyahu.

In addition to devotion to Elohim and Yahweh, names could also be sentences of praise in their own right. The name טוביהו Ṭôḇiyyāhû means "Good of/is the LORD".

== Names of Aramaic origin ==
Aramaic was a major vernacular language of Israel at the time of Jesus, though it was not the only language spoken in the region. Aramaic was also the language used to write parts of the Book of Daniel, the Book of Ezra, and the entire Jewish Babylonian Talmud. Aramaic remained the lingua franca of the Middle East until the time of Islam.

Judæo-Aramaic names include עבד־נגו ʻĂḇēḏ-nəḡô, בר־תלמי Bar-Talmay and תום Tôm, as well as Bar Kochba.

== Hebrew-Greek names ==
Due to the Hellenisation of the Eastern Mediterranean and the movement of Jews around the area, many Hebrew names were adapted to Greek, reinforced by the translation of the Tanakh in the Septuagint with many Hellenized names.

Many of the names in the New Testament are of Hebrew and Aramaic origin, but were adapted to the Greek by Hellenistic Christian writers such as Paul of Tarsus.

Such Hebræo-Greek names include Ἰησοῦς Iēsous (originally from ישׁוע Yēšûªʻ), Νῶε Nōē (originally from נח Nōªḥ), Ἰσαΐας Isaias (originally from ישׁעיהו Yəšaʻªyāhû), Ἰσραήλ Israēl (originally from ישראל Yiśrā’ēl).

Furthermore, some Jews of the time had Greek Gentile names themselves, such as the Christian Luke (Greek Λουκᾶς Loukas). Though used by some Jews at the time, these names are generally not associated with Jews today, and are considered characteristically Greek and largely confined to use by Christians. Hebrew forms of the names exist, but they are extremely rare.

== Hebrew-Latin names ==
Many Hebrew names were adapted into Latin, some via Greek. Such names include Jesus (from Greek Ἱησοῦς Iēsous) and Maria (from Greek Μαρία Maria, itself from Μαριάμ Mariam, originally from Hebrew מרים Miryām).

Also, some Jews during Roman times also had Latin names for themselves, such as the Christian evangelist Mark (Latin Marcus). As was the case with contemporary Jewish names of Greek origin, most of those Latin names are generally not associated with Jews today and have retained a Roman and Christian character.

== Hebrew-Arabic names ==
With the rise of Islam and the establishment of an Arab Caliphate, the Arabic language became the lingua franca of the Middle East and some parts of Berber North Africa. Islamic scripture such as the Qurʼan, however, contains many names of Hebrew origin (often via Aramaic), and there were Jewish and Christian minorities living under Arab Islamic rule. As such, many Hebrew names had been adapted to Arabic and could be found in the Arab world. Jews and Christians generally used the Arabic adaptations of those names, just as English-speaking Jews and sometimes Muslims often use anglicized versions like Joshua, rather than Yəhôšúªʼ,

While most such names are common to traditional Arabic translations of the Bible, a few differ; for instance, Arabic-speaking Christians use Yasūʻ instead of ʻĪsā for "Jesus".

Such Hebræo-Arabic names include:

- ʼAyyūb أيّوب (from Hebrew איוב ʼIyyôḇ) (Job)
- Yūsuf يوسف (from Hebrew יוסף Yôsēp̄) (Joseph)
- Dāʼūd داۇد (from Hebrew דוד Dāwiḏ) (David)
- ʼIsmāʻīl اسماعيل (from Hebrew ישׁמעאל Yišmāʻêl) (Ishmael)
- ʼIsḥāq إسحاق (from Hebrew יצחק Yiṣḥāq) (Isaac)
- Yaʻqūb يعقوب (from Hebrew יעקב Yaʻªqōḇ) (Jacob)
- ʼĀdam آدم (from Hebrew אדם ʼĀḏām) (Adam)
- Ḥawwāʼ حواء (from Hebrew חוה Ḥawwāh) (Eve)
- Suleiman سُلَيْمان (from Hebrew שְׁלֹמֹה Šĕlōmō) (Solomon)

The influence of Aramaic is observable in several names, notably ʼIsḥāq (Isaac), where the Syriac form is simply Îsḥāq, contrasting with more Hebraic forms such as Yaʻqūb (Jacob).

Some of these Arabic names preserve original Hebrew pronunciations that were later changed by regular sound shifts; migdal, recorded in the New Testament as Magdalene and in Palestinian Arabic as Majdala, which turned a in unstressed closed syllables into i.

Typically, Hebrew אל -ʼēl was adapted as ـايل -īl, and Hebrew יה -yāh as ـيا -yāʼ.

== Hebrew-English names ==
James I of England commissioned a translation of the Christian Bible from the original languages, including a translation of the Tanakh, or Old Testament, from Hebrew into English, which became known as the King James Version of the Bible and is often referred to today by the abbreviation "KJV".

Even so, many KJV Old Testament names were not entirely without New Testament Greek influence. The influence mostly reflected the vowels of names and left most of the consonants largely intact and only modestly filtered to consonants of contemporary English phonology. However, all KJV names followed the Greek convention of not distinguishing between soft and dāḡeš forms of ב bêṯ. The habits resulted in multilingually-fused Hebrew-Helleno-English names, such as Judah, Isaiah and Jeremiah. Additionally, a handful of names were adapted directly from Greek without even partial translations from Hebrew, including names such as Isaac, Moses and Jesse.

Along with names from the KJV edition of the New Testament, these names constitute the large part of Hebrew names as they exist in the English-speaking world.

== Jewish usage ==
A Hebrew name is used in a religious context during prayer. When deceased relatives are remembered during the Yizkor memorial service or during the El Malei Blessing, the Hebrew name of the deceased is used along with the Hebrew name of the father. When the Misheberach (prayer for the sick) is recited, the ill person's Hebrew name is said along with the Hebrew name of the mother. When an adult Jew is called to receive an aliyah to the Torah, they are identified with their Hebrew personal name along with their father's Hebrew name; for example, Ya'akov ben Chaim. (In some communities, especially those who allow women the honour of receiving an aliyah, the practice is to include both parents' names in the context of an aliyah; for example, Elisheva bat Moshe v'Sarah.)

While, strictly speaking, a "Hebrew name" for ritual use is in the Hebrew language, it is not uncommon in some Ashkenazi communities for people to have names of Yiddish origin, or a mixed Hebrew-Yiddish name; for example, the name Simhah Bunim, where simhah means "happiness" in Hebrew, and Bunim is a Yiddish-language name possibly derived from the French bon nom ("good name").

Converts to Judaism may choose whatever Hebrew name they like as a personal name. However, the parental names in their case are not the names of their actual parents, but rather Avraham v'Sarah, who are (as the first patriarch and matriarch of Jewish tradition) the prototypical "parents" in Judaism.

== See also ==
- Arabic name
- Bilingual Hebrew-Yiddish tautological names
- Christian name
- Jewish name change
- List of Hebrew place names
