= Maidman =

Maidman is a surname. Notable people with the surname include:

- Daniel Maidman (born 1975), American artist
- Jennifer Maidman (born 1958 as Ian Maidman), British musician, singer, producer, songwriter, actor, and author

== See also ==
- Maiman
- Saidman
