= Nathan Najar =

Nathan Najar was rabbi at Constantine, Algeria, in the 15th century, son of Maimun Najar, and a contemporary of Solomon ben Simon Duran. The latter addressed to him a letter, which, together with Najar's answer, is found in Israel Akrish's Ḳobeẓ Wikkuḥim, and is reprinted, with corrections and index of passages, in Kerem Ḥemed, ix. 110 et seq.

== Jewish Encyclopedia bibliography ==
- Azulai, Shem ha-Gedolim, i.104, No. 32, Warsaw, 1876;
- Fürst, Bibl. Jud. iii.12;
- Grätz, Gesch. vii.502.
