= Ephraim Alnaqua =

Physician, rabbi and writer

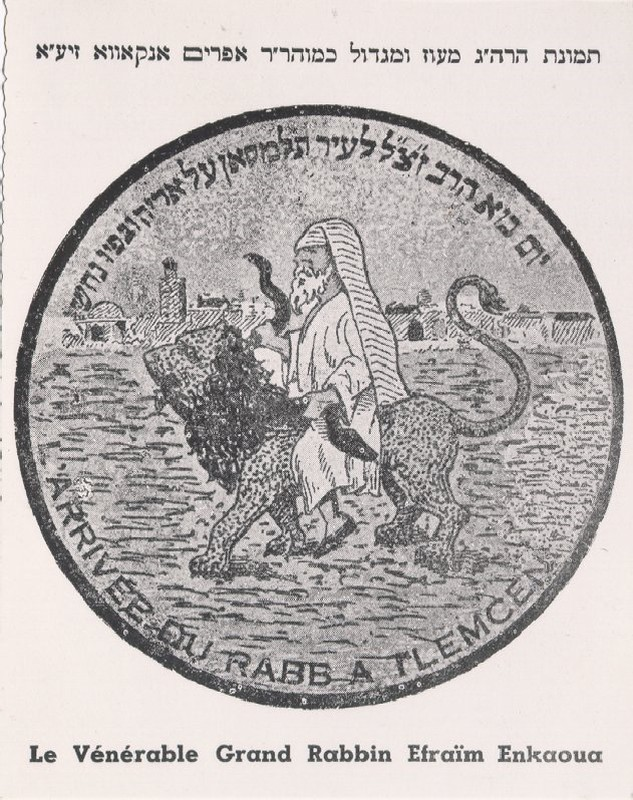
Arrival of Ephraim Alnaqua in Tlemcen.

Rabbi Ephraim ben Israel Alnaqua (1359–1442) (Hebrew: אפרים בן ישראל אלנאקוה, romanized: Efrayim ben Yisra'el 'alnakuvah) (also, "Al-Nakawa", "Al-Nakava", "Ankava", "Ankoa", "Enkaoua", "Alnucawi", etc., Hebrew: "נקוה", "אלנאקוה", "אנקווה", "אנקאווא") was a physician, rabbi, theological writer, and founder of the Jewish community at Tlemçen (Algeria), where he died in 1442.

According to a legend, Alnaqua escaped from the Spanish Inquisition, which had martyred his father (Rabbi Israel Ben Joseph Alnaqua) and mother at the stake during or around the time of the Massacre of 1391 in Toledo, and came to Tlemçen mounted on a lion, using a serpent as a halter. Azulai refers to him as a miracle worker. Alnaqua succeeded, after all, other physicians had failed, in curing the only daughter of a king of the Zayyanid dynasty. Refusing the reward of gold and silver offered him by the king, he begged only that the Jews living near Tlemçen might be united in it. In this way, the community was formed.

Alnaqua's first care was to establish a large synagogue: this is still in existence, and bears his name. Above the rabbi's chair, on which a verse from the Book of Jeremiah is engraved: "A glorious high throne from the beginning is the place of our sanctuary" (Jeremiah 17:12, Hebrew: ירמיהו יז יב) and a lamp burns there perpetually. Alnaqua's grave, surrounded by those of his family, is in the old cemetery: it is sacred to North African Jews, and is frequently visited but is currently closed by pilgrims from all Algeria. He is also venerated by Moroccan Jews.

Alnaqua had two sons, Israel and Judah. The latter lived at Oran, Mostaganem, and, later, at Tlemçen, and became the father-in-law of the son of Solomon ben Simon Duran. Alnaqua wrote for his elder son Israel Shaar Kevod Adonai (Entrance to the Glory of God), containing answers to the criticisms of Nahmanides on the Moreh of Maimonides. Manuscripts of this work exist in the Bodleian Library, Oxford. He also wrote some hymns.

== Other family members ==
- Israel Alnaqua
- Jacky N'Kaoua, aka Papi Jacky

== Jewish Encyclopedia bibliography ==
- Azulai, Shem ha-Gedolim, s.v.;
- Benjacob, Oẓar ha-Sefarim, p. 599;
- Neubauer, Cat. Bodl. Hebr. MSS. Nos. 939, 2; 1258, 2;
- Revue Africaine, 1870, pp. 377–383;
- Zunz, Z. G. p. 435;
- idem, Literaturgesch. p. 524.
