= Sebastian Miczyński =

Sebastian Miczynski was a 16th/17th century Polish academic. Professor of philosophy at Kraków Jagellonian University.

In 1618 Sebastian Miczynski published antisemitic pamphlet Zwierciadlo Korony Polskej (The Mirror of the Polish Crown), which was one of the causes of anti-Jewish riots in Kraków. In order to prevent further disorders King Sigismund III Vasa forbade the dissemination of this pamphlet, as did his son, Władysław IV Vasa (during Election sejm of 1632) - however successive editions of Zwierciadlo appeared, contributing to the birth of antisemitic literature in Poland.
