= Jewish name change =

There are several major issues related to the change of a Jewish given name or a Jewish surname: legal regulations in modern Israel, Hebraization of surnames and sometimes given names, and ritualistic name changes according to the traditions of Judaism.

== Modern regulations ==
Main: Israeli name law

The current Israeli name law was adopted in 1956 and amended several times.

Israeli citizens and Israeli residents abroad may request the change of the first or last name of themselves, as well as of all immediate family members: spouse and minor children. It is advisable that these name changes follow the advice of the Talmud.

== Hebraization ==
The movement for the Hebraization of surnames, i.e., bringing them into an accordance with the Hebrew language, originated already among the Yishuv (early returners to the land of Israel), who had a strong feeling of "Negation of the Diaspora", and often wanted to get rid of their golah ("Diaspora") surnames. It was also part of the ideology of Zionism, aimed at the creation of the image of the new Israeli Jews, different from the stereotypes of Jews as oppressed Yiddish-speaking, shtetl dwellers. Some immigrants of the First Aliyah (1882–1903) also Hebraized their surnames, and this movement grew during the Second Aliyah (1904–1914).

== Name changes in the Bible ==
Abram's name was changed to "Abraham" ('the father of many nations'), and that of Sarai ('my princess') to "Sarah" (a princess, in general); Jacob's name was changed to "Israel" ('a mighty prince'); Pharaoh called Joseph "Zaphnath-Paaneah" ('the revealer of secrets'); Moses changed the name of Hoshea to "Jehoshua" ('God saves'); Solomon was called by Nathan "Jedidiah" ('God's beloved'). Pharaoh-nechoh appointed Eliakim king of Jerusalem and changed his name to "Jehoiakim" ('the Lord's confirmed'); the King of Babylon made Mattaniah king of Jerusalem and called him "Zedekiah" ('the Lord's right man'); and the names of Daniel and his comrades were changed to Babylonian ones.

== Ritualistic name change ==
In the traditions of Judaism, the changing of a person's name was done as a tribute to his achievements, or as a sign that his condition will be improved, or particularly as a segula to aid to his recovery from illness. There are two types of name change: "Shinnuy Shem" (Hebrew: שינוי שם), which simply means "name change", and הוספת שם, hosafat shem ("adding a name"). Adding a name may also be done simply when a person with non-Hebrew name wants to add a Hebrew one.

=== To prevent wickedness ===
The names of wicked persons were a curse in the community; and the righteous were called "by another name." That is, the idea prevailed that the name of a wicked person exerted an influence on the moral character and destiny of any person who adopted it, and consequently that a man might be judged by the name he bore. For this reason Rabbenu Tam corrected the text in the Talmud from "Avshalom" to "Avishalom," and from "Shebna" (the Jerusalemite) to "Shakhna", because Shebna was wicked.

=== As a cure for illness ===
The change of name as a cure for illness is derived from the Talmud: "Four things annul the decree that seals a person's fate; namely, alms, prayer, change of name, and change of deeds." Judah he-Ḥasid says if one is dangerously sick his name shall be changed, which may reverse the decree. Perez claims that the change of name for the benefit of a patient is in conformity with a taḳḳanah of the Geonim. The new name for the patient is selected from the Bible, the first name that appears on a given page being adopted. Israel Bruna in his responsa protested against the adoption of the name of a wicked person when such was the first found, and ordered it to be passed over for the first righteous one, citing "The memory of the just is blessed: but the name of the wicked shall perish."

The underlying principle in changing the name of one who is ill is the assumption that the former name, under which the divine decree was issued, becomes non-existent, and that, when a new name is given him, he becomes another person, in regard to whom the decree has no force. In a later period the original name was retained and another added to it, usually one signifying the recovery of the patient. The most popular additional names were "Ḥayyim" ('life'), "Shalom" (peace), "Raphael" (God heals), "Azriel" ('God helps'), or some other name, selected from the Bible.

The additional name is traditionally given in the synagogue when the scroll is taken out of the Ark and unrolled, the first righteous name that is read being selected.

== See also ==
- Kinnui
