= Mirror of the Polish Crown =

1618 pamphlet by Sebastian Miczyński

Mirror of the Polish Crown (Polish: Zwierciadło Korony Polskiej; full title Mirror of the Polish Crown expressing the profound insults and great anxieties it receives from the Jews) is an antisemitic pamphlet published in 1618 by Sebastian Miczyński, professor of philosophy at the Jagellonian University in Kraków. Because this pamphlet was one of the causes of the anti-Jewish riots in Kraków, to the petition from local Jews, it was censored by Sigismund III Vasa. Despite this, the book run through numerous reprints.

In this pamphlet Jews were accused of political treachery, robbery, swindling, murder, witchcraft, and sacrilege; however religious accusations are of secondary importance. The pamphlet mainly focuses on the economic activities of the Jews and advocates the expulsion of the Jews from Poland.
