= Councils of Narbonne =

The Councils of Narbonne were a series of provincial councils of the Catholic Church held in Narbonne, France.

== Council of 255 – 260 ==
A council was supposedly held in Narbonne between 255 and 260. According to legend, Paul of Narbonne was accused of sexual immorality and a council was held to adjudicate the charges, at which he was miraculously exonerated.

== Council of 589 ==
A council was held in Narbonne on 1 November 589. Migetius, the archbishop of Toledo, presided. Eight bishops attended. The council ratified the acts of the Third Council of Toledo, which the local bishops had been unable to attend due to illness.

The council also published fifteen canons, including restrictions on the behavior of the clergy, a ban on Jews singing psalms when burying their dead, and condemnation of divination. A major concern of the council was limiting the influence of lay patrons over clerics.

== Council of 791 ==
Twenty-six bishops attended, and two others sent representatives. The council discussed the heresy of Felix of Urgel.

== Council of 1043 ==
The council of 1043 reaffirmed the Pax Dei. Its canons are now lost.

== Council of 1045 ==
The council of 1043 again reaffirmed the Pax Dei. Its canons are also now lost.

== Council of 1054 ==
Guifred de Cerdagne convened a council in Narbonne on 28 August 1054. Ten bishops attended. The council published twenty-nine canons. It once again reaffirmed the Pax Dei, banning the killing of Christians, although it distinguished just from unjust killing. It explicitly obliged women to obey the Pax.

== Council of 1055 ==
A council was held in Narbonne on 1 October 1055, to address Guillermo Bernardez and others accused of seizing church property.

== Council of 1090 ==
A council was held in Narbonne on 20 March 1090. Dalmatius, the archbishop of Narbonne, presided.

== Council of 1227 ==
Pierre Amiel, the archbishop of Narbonne, presided. The council confirmed the Statute of Pamiers, and published twenty canons of its own. Jews were required to wear identifying symbols and make yearly payments to the local parish church, and banned from charging excessive interest. Raymond VII, Roger-Bernard II, the Viscount of Béziers, and the people of Toulouse were excommunicated. Bishops were ordered to use spies to seek out heretics, and those suspected of heresy were banned from public office.

== Council of 1243 ==
The council held in 1243 is frequently dated incorrectly to 1235. Bishops in attendance included Pierre Amiel, archbishop of Narbonne; Jean Baussan, archbishop of Arles; and Raimond Audibert, archbishop of Aix.

The council published twenty-nine canons, all regarding the Inquisition and Waldensian heretics. Penances were imposed on heretics who voluntarily surrendered to the inquisitors and offered testimony against themselves or others: these included attendance at religious services, corporal punishment, and taking part in the Crusades. Other repentant heretics were imprisoned for life, with the sentence deferred until prison capacity was available. Unrepentant or relapsed heretics were turned over to the secular courts. The anonymity of accusing witnesses was guaranteed.

== Council of 1259 or 1261 ==
In either 1259 or 1261, Gui Foulques, the archbishop of Narbonne, convened a council which restricted work done on Sundays.

== Council of 1374 ==
A council was held in Narbonne on 15 April 1374, by order of Pope Gregory XI. Pierre de La Jugie, the archbishop of Narbonne, presided. The council published twenty-eight canons. These included bans on preaching by the laity and on Christian burials for the excommunicated.

== Council of 1430 ==
A council was held in Narbonne on 29 May 1430. Pierre II de Cotigny, bishop of Castres, presided. Five bishops attended. The council presented a formal complaint to the Archbishop of Narbonne, accusing him of usurping the authority of other bishops.

== Council of 1551 ==
Alexander Zerbinet, vicar-general of Narbonne, presided. The council published sixty-six canons. These included a confession of faith, a number of requirements on candidates for priesthood, and restrictions on the behavior of the clergy. Wandering pardoners were regulated.

== Council of 1607 ==
Louis de Vervins, archbishop of Narbonne, presided. Seven bishops attended. The council published forty-nine canons. These included regulations on behavior in churches, and required written permission from the bishop to own the Bible in French translation.
