= Sandman (surname) =

Sandman is a surname. Notable people with the surname include:

- Charles W. Sandman Jr. (1921–1985), American politician
- Don Sandman (1889–1973), New Zealand cricketer
- Felix Sandman (born 1998), Swedish singer, songwriter and actor
- Mark Sandman (1952–1999), American singer and co-founder of the band Morphine
