= Maiman =

Maiman is a surname. Notable people with the surname include:

- Theodore Harold Maiman (1927–2007), American engineer and physicist
- Yossi Maiman (1946−2021), German-born Israeli businessman

== See also ==
- Maidman
