= Israel Alnaqua =

Jewish writer and martyr

Rabbi Israel ben Joseph Alnaqua (Hebrew: ישראל בן יוסף אלנאקוה) (also, "Al-Nakawa", "Al-Nakava", "Ankava", "Ankoa", "Alnucawi", etc., Hebrew: "נקוה", "אלנאקוה", "אנקווה", "אנקאווא") (died 1391) was an ethical writer and martyr who lived in Toledo, Spain. He died at the stake, together with Judah ben Asher, during the massacres in the summer of 1391.

He is the author of an ethical work in twenty chapters, entitled Menorat ha-Maor (Hebrew: מנורת המאור, lit. 'The Lamp of Illumination'). The work commences with a long poem, an acrostic on the author's name. Then follows a preface in rimed prose. The introduction to each chapter is headed by a poem, giving the acrostic of his name, Israel. It was printed in 1578. A manuscript of it is in the Bodleian. An abridgment of it was published at Kraków, 1593, under the title Menorat Zahav Kullah (Candelabra Wholly of Gold). It is divided into five sections, which contain observations

1. on laws in general
2. on education
3. on commerce
4. on the behavior of litigants and judges in court
5. on conduct toward one's fellow men.

This is supplemented by a treatise, שפת אליהו רבה, consisting of Talmudic and midrashic sayings and maxims, which has been published in German (Hebrew characters) in Wagenseil's Belehrung der Jüd.-Deutschen Red-und Schreibart, Königsberg, 1699.

== Other family members ==
- Ephraim Alnaqua

== Jewish Encyclopedia bibliography ==
- Zunz, Z. G. p. 435;
- Benjacob, Oẓar ha-Sefarim, p. 337, No. 1436;
- Steinschneider, Cat. Bodl. No. 5447;
- S. Schechter, Monatsschrift, xxxiv. 114, 234.

== See also ==
- Hasidic philosophy
- R' Zusha of Hanipol, author of "Menorat Zahav"
