= Raphael Zeror =

Algerian rabbi

Personal life
- Born: September 8, 1681 Algiers, Regency of Algiers, Ottoman Empire
- Died: December 21, 1737 (aged 56) Algiers, Regency of Algiers, Ottoman Empire

Religious life
- Religion: Judaism

Raphael Jedidiah Solomon ben Jeshua Ẓeror (Hebrew: רפאל ידידיה שלמה בן ישועה צרור, romanized: Refaʼel Yedidyah Shelomoh ben Yeshuʿah Tseror; September 8, 1681 – December 21, 1737) was an Algerian rabbi.

== Biography ==
Raphael Jedidiah Solomon Ẓeror was born in Algiers in 1681. He hailed from a notable family of Talmudic scholars, and his grandfather, Solomon Ẓeror, held the position of chief rabbi in Algiers. Ẓeror pursued studies in various secular disciplines, with a particular focus on logic, physics, and geography. He also occupied himself with poetry, and gained a reputation as both a skilled physician and a businessman.

Together with the other rabbis of his city, Ẓeror endorsed the excommunication of Neḥemiah Ḥayyun. A portion of his responsa and novellae were collected by his disciple Judah 'Ayyashi, and published under the title Peri Ẓaddiḳ (Leghorn, 1748). This edition featured a preface written by Ẓeror's pupils and contemporaries.
