= Maimun Najar =

Maimun Najar was a rabbi at Constantine, Algeria, in the first half of the 15th century.

== Life and work ==
Like his contemporaries and countrymen Isaac ben Sheshet and Simon ben Ẓemaḥ Duran, he left Spain in consequence of the persecutions and fled (1395) to Algeria. In his responsa Tashbaẓ (part i., No. 86, Amsterdam, 1738) Duran calls Najar "Maimun ben David", but David Conforte, in Ḳore ha-Dorot, p. 26b, designates him as "Maimun ben Saadia." Najar's correspondence with Duran on religious questions is found in Tashbaẓ (part i., Nos. 94-96, 131-134, 154-157; part ii., Nos. 4, 68-73, 86, 89, 135, 164-168).

== Jewish Encyclopedia bibliography ==
- Azulai, Shem ha-Gedolim, i. 88, No. 39, Warsaw, 1876;
- Julius Fürst, Bibl. Jud. iii. 12.
