= Simeon ben Zemah Duran =

Sephardic Jewish rabbi and scholar (1361–1444)

Simeon ben Zemah Duran, also Tzemach Duran (1361–1444; Hebrew: שמעון בן צמח דוראן), known as Rashbatz (רשב"ץ) or Tashbatz, was a prominent Jewish scholar, rabbinic authority, and polemicist. He was proficient in various fields, including philosophy, mathematics, natural sciences, astronomy, and medicine. Born in Medieval Spain, he fled with his family to Algeria in the aftermath of the 1391 pogroms that devastated the Jewish community of Spain. In 1408, he became the rabbinic leader of Algerian Jewry, earning widespread recognition for his legal rulings in Spain, North Africa, France, and Italy.

== Biography ==
Simeon ben Tzemach was born in the Hebrew month of Adar, 1361. Various accounts put his birthplace as either Barcelona, or the island of Mallorca. He was a near relation but not a grandson of Levi ben Gershon. He was a student of Ephraim Vidal, and of Jonah de Maestre, rabbi in Zaragoza or in Calatayud, whose daughter Bongoda he married.

After the 1391 massacre in the Balearic Islands, he fled Spain with his father and sister for Algiers, where, in addition to practicing medicine, he continued his studies during the earlier part of his stay. In 1394 he and the Algerian rabbi Isaac ben Sheshet ("the Rivash") drafted statutes for the Jewish community of Algiers. After the Rivash's retirement, Duran became rabbi of Algiers in 1407. Unlike his predecessor, he refused on principle to accept any confirmation of his appointment by the regent. As Duran had lost all his property during the massacre at Palma, he was forced against his will to accept a salary from the community, not having other means of subsistence. He held this office until his death. His epitaph, written by himself, has been reprinted for the first time, from a manuscript, in Orient, Lit. v. 452. According to Joseph ben Isaac Sambari, Simon was much respected in court circles. He was the father of the Solomon ben Simon Duran.

Duran's Magen Avot (Shield of the Forefathers) was a polemic against Christians and Muslims, of which the fourth chapter of the second part was published separately as Keshet u-Magen ("Bow and shield"). Keshet u-Magen is a two-part polemic, with the first segment attacking Christianity and the second sharply criticizing Islam. This second segment is considered the most severe critique of Islam ever written by a medieval Jewish author, showcasing Duran's deep knowledge of Islamic texts, including the Quran, hadith, and tafsir.

== Works ==
Simon was prolific. He wrote commentaries on several tractates of the Mishnah and the Talmud and on Alfasi (Nos. 4, 5, 7, 11, 12, and 16 in the list of his works given below); he treated various religious dogmas as well as the synagogal rite of Algiers (Nos. 5, 8, 10, 16), while in his responsa he showed a profound acquaintance with the entire halakic literature. His theologico-philosophical scholarship, as well as his secular learning, is conspicuous in his elaborate work, Magen Abot, in which he also appears as a clever controversialist (No. 7). The same ability is evidenced in his writings against Hasdai Crescas, which afford him an opportunity to defend Maimonides (No. 2), in his commentary on the Pentateuch (No. 6), where he takes occasion to enter into polemics with Levi ben Gershon, and in that on the Book of Job (No. 1), especially the introduction. In his commentary on the Pirke Avot he shows a broad historical sense (No. 7, part iv.) and it is not improbable that the tradition which ascribes to him the historico-didactic poem Seder ha-Mishneh leha-Rambam (No. 9) is well founded.

Simon also wrote a considerable number of poems, both religious and secular (Nos. 9 [?], 15); commented on the Pesah Haggadah, the Hoshanot, the works of more ancient poets (Nos. 5 (c), 13, 14), and he was the author of numerous pamphlets. The following list of Duran's writings is arranged according to the letters of the Hebrew alphabet, on the basis of a catalogue drawn up by the author himself (Responsa, vol. iii.):

1. Oheb Mishpaṭ, commentary on the Book of Job, with a theologico-philosophical introduction, Venice, 1589; Amsterdam, 1724-1727 (in the Rabbinic Bible Ḳehillat Mosheh).
2. Or ha-Ḥayyim, controversial treatise against Hasdai Crescas' Or Adonai.
3. Zohar ha-Raḳia, commentary on Solomon ibn Gabirol's Azharot, Constantinople, 1515. (Jacob Hagis [Petil Tekelet] and Moses Pisante Ner Miẓwah have reedited this work, of which a shorter recension also exists.)
4. Ḥiddushe ha-Rashbaẓ, novellæ on and elucidations of Niddah, Rosh ha-Shanah, Kinnim, Leghorn, 1744. (Ḥiddushim, novellæ to Ketubot and Gittin [Färth, 1779], is erroneously ascribed to Duran.)
5. Yabin Shemu'ah:
  1. precepts for shehitah and bedikah
  2. Ma'amar Ḥameẓ, precepts concerning hamez and mazzah
  3. Afiḳomen, commentary on the Pesah Haggadah
  4. Tif'eret Yisrael, on the computations of the new moon ("moladot")
  5. Perush, commentary on the Mishnah Zebahim, ch. v. ("Ezehu Meḳoman"), and the Baraita de Rabbi Yishma'el (taken from the Sifra) subjoined thereto in the prayerbook (Leghorn, 1744). Part (c) appeared as Ma'amar Afiḳomen with the Haggadah (Rödelheim, 1822).
6. Liwyat Ḥen, commentary on the Pentateuch; also two tracts against Hasdai Crescas ("Anaḳim," "Ma'amar Ha-Yiḥud")
7. Magen Abot, consisting of four parts with special titles:
  1. "Ḥeleḳ Eloah mi-Ma'al"
  2. "Ḥeleḳ Shosenu"
  3. "Ḥeleḳ Ya'aḳob"
  4. "Ḥeleḳ Adonai 'Ammo."
  5. A commentary on Abot, including a literary-historical introduction on the sequence of tradition, appeared under the title "Magen Abot," Leghorn, 1762; reedited by Y. Fischl, Leipsic, 1855. Under the same title appeared parts i.-iii., with the exception of one chapter in part ii. (ib. 1785). The missing chapter in this edition, being a polemic against Christianity and Islam, was published under the title Ḳeshet u-Magen (ib. 1785–1790; reedited by Steinschneider, Berlin, 1881). Extracts from this chapter, "Setirat Emunat ha-Noẓrim," are contained in Milḥemet Ḥobah, Amsterdam, 1710. It is largely taken from Profiat Duran's Kelimmat ha-Goyim (Monatsschrift, iv. 179).
8. Minhagim, ritual observances, presumably treating of the rites in Algiers.
9. Seder ha-Mishneh leha-Rambam, didactic poem, ascribed to Duran in MS. Poc. 74 (Neubauer, Cat. Bodl. Hebr. MSS. No. 1971).
10. Perush ha-Ketubbah weha-Geṭ, on marriage contracts and divorces, Constantinople, c. 1516–1548.
11. Perush Hilkot Berakot le-Harif, commentary on Alfasi's Berakot.
12. Perush Masseket 'Eduyyot, commentary on Eduyyot.
13. Perush 'al ha-Hosha'not, published with the Hoshanot according to the Spanish rite, Ferrara, 1553. (A short extract from the Perush is contained in the Spanish prayer-book of 1571.)
14. Perush Ḳeẓat Piyyuṭim, of which several pieces are inserted in the Algiers Mahzor, Leghorn, 1772. (The commentary on the introduction, "[Baruk] Asher Ishshesh," may also be found in B. Goldberg's Ḥefes Maṭmonim, pp. 85 et seq., Berlin, 1845.)
15. Ḳunṭras Teḥinnot u-Pizmonim, religious and secular poems. (The elegy (ḳinah) on the destruction of Jerusalem, "Eksof le-Sapper," was published in Profiat Duran's Iggeret Al-Tehi, Constantinople, c. 1577; that on the persecutions in Spain in the second edition of Magen Abot, Leipsic, 1855. A larger collection was edited by I. Morali in part i. of his Ẓofnat Pa'aneaḥ, Berlin, 1897.)
16. Remaze Pisḳe Niddah (distinct from No. 4).
17. Taḳḳun ha-Ḥazzanim, of which the title only is known.
18. Taḳḳanot ha-Rashbaẓ, inserted in part ii. of the responsa, (19), and in Judah Ayyash's responsa, entitled Bet Yehudah, Leghorn, 1746.
19. Tashbaẓ, 802 responsa in three parts, Amsterdam, 1738–1739; title ed., ib. 1741.
