= Solomon ben Simon Duran =

Solomon ben Simon Duran (c. 1400 – 1467) (Hebrew: שלמה בן שמעון דוראן), known as Rashbash, was a medieval rabbi with antagonistic views towards the Kabbalah, and the son and successor of Simon ben Zemah Duran.

Solomon was born in Algiers, and in his youth became familiar with the Talmud and rabbinical literature, and with a resoluteness remarkable for his time he protested against the Kabbala. Like his father, he was the author of many responsa (published in Leghorn, 1742); his letter, written in the language of the Talmud, to Nathan Nagara in Constantine has been separately reprinted, with an index of passages (Kerem Ḥemed, ix.110 et seq.). His defense of the Talmud, written in 1437 against the attacks of the convert Geronimo de Santa Fé, appeared under the title Milḥemet Ḥobah, and also the title Setirat Emunat ha-Noẓrim, after the second part of his father's Ḳeshet u-Magen. It was also published separately at Leipzig in 1856. His treatise Tikkun Soferim, which has frequently been ascribed to his father, is printed as an appendix to the work Yabin Shemu'ah, Leghorn, 1744. A dirge written by him has been preserved in manuscript.

== Jewish Encyclopedia bibliography ==
- David Conforte, Ḳore ha-Dorot, p. 26b;
- Kerem Ḥemed, ix.114 et seq.;
- Giovanni Bernardo De Rossi-C. H. Hamberger, Historisches Wörterbuch, p. 94;
- Orient, iii.812 et seq.;
- Heinrich Grätz, Gesch., viii.166;
- Zunz, Literaturgesch., p. 1646;
- Elkan Nathan Adler, in Jew. Quart. Rev. xii.147
