= Martin Luther and antisemitism =

16th century German Reformation theologian's hatred of European Jews

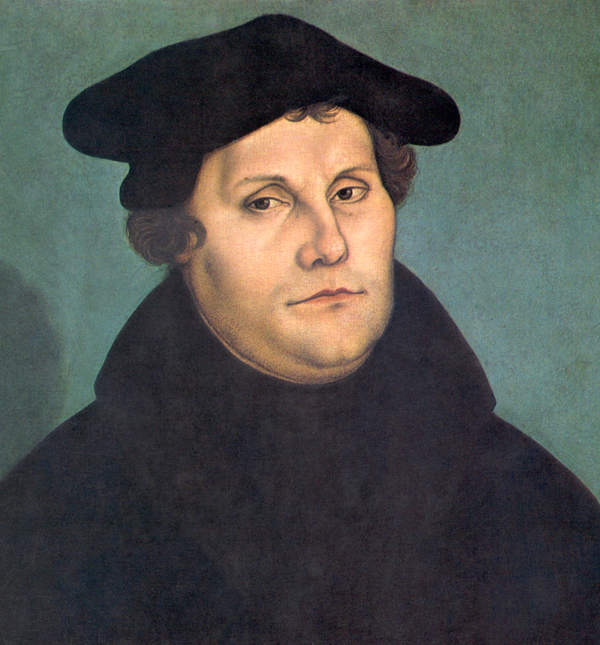
Martin Luther

Martin Luther (1483–1546) was a German professor of theology, priest, and seminal leader of the Reformation. His positions on Judaism continue to be controversial. These changed dramatically from his early career, where he showed concern for the plight of European Jews, to his later years, when he became outspoken in his statements and writings denouncing the Jews.

== Evolution of his views ==
Luther's attitude toward Jews changed throughout his life. At the beginning of his career, he was influenced by Johann Reuchlin, who was the great-uncle of his friend Philip Melanchthon. Luther relied on Reuchlin to answer questions about Hebrew and used one of his Cabalistic books to help his argument in a debate. Reuchlin had successfully prevented the Holy Roman Empire from burning Jewish books but was racked by heresy proceedings as a result. In the early phase of Luther's career—until around 1536—he expressed concern for their plight in Europe and was enthusiastic at the prospect of converting them to Christianity through his religious reforms. Being unsuccessful in that, in his later career, Luther denounced Judaism and called for harsh persecution of its followers, so that they might not be allowed to teach.

=== Early years ===
Luther's first known comment on the Jews is in a letter written to George Spalatin in 1514:

Conversion of the Jews will be the work of God alone operating from within, and not of man working — or rather playing — from without. If these offences be taken away, worse will follow. For they are thus given over by the wrath of God to reprobation, that they may become incorrigible, as Ecclesiastes says, for every one who is incorrigible is rendered worse rather than better by correction.

In 1519, Luther challenged the doctrine Servitus Judaeorum ('Servitude of the Jews'), established in Corpus Juris Civilis by Justinian I from 529 to 534. He wrote: "Absurd theologians defend hatred for the Jews. ... What Jew would consent to enter our ranks when he sees the cruelty and enmity we wreak on them—that in our behavior towards them we less resemble Christians than beasts?"

In his 1523 essay That Jesus Christ Was Born a Jew, Luther condemned the inhuman treatment of the Jews and urged Christians to treat them kindly. Luther's fervent desire was that Jews would hear the Gospel proclaimed clearly and be moved to convert to Christianity. Thus he argued:

If I had been a Jew and had seen such dolts and blockheads govern and teach the Christian faith, I would sooner have become a hog than a Christian. They have dealt with the Jews as if they were dogs rather than human beings; they have done little else than deride them and seize their property. When they baptize them they show them nothing of Christian doctrine or life, but only subject them to popishness and mockery...If the apostles, who also were Jews, had dealt with us Gentiles as we Gentiles deal with the Jews, there would never have been a Christian among the Gentiles ... When we are inclined to boast of our position [as Christians] we should remember that we are but Gentiles, while the Jews are of the lineage of Christ. We are aliens and in-laws; they are blood relatives, cousins, and brothers of our Lord. Therefore, if one is to boast of flesh and blood the Jews are actually nearer to Christ than we are...If we really want to help them, we must be guided in our dealings with them not by papal law but by the law of Christian love. We must receive them cordially, and permit them to trade and work with us, that they may have occasion and opportunity to associate with us, hear our Christian teaching, and witness our Christian life. If some of them should prove stiff-necked, what of it? After all, we ourselves are not all good Christians either.

=== Anti-Jewish agitation ===
Erasmus had characterized the (Anabaptist) Sabbatarian movements in Bohemia and Moravia as re-judaizing, by analogy; Luther believed further that these movements had re-introduced circumcision (i.e. works of law against faith and grace) and were the result of active Jewish proselytizing.

Some time prior to 1536, Luther had met with three rabbis and presented his Christological interpretation of the Old Testament; the rabbis in turn presented their Talmudic interpretation, which did not mention Christ. In the years following his failure to convince the rabbis, Luther became increasingly anti-Jewish.

Luther successfully campaigned against the Jews in Saxony, Brandenburg, and Silesia. In August 1536 Luther's prince, Elector of Saxony John Frederick, issued a mandate that prohibited Jews from inhabiting, engaging in business in, or passing through his realm. An Alsatian shtadlan, Rabbi Josel of Rosheim, asked a reformer Wolfgang Capito to approach Luther to obtain an audience with the prince, but Luther refused every intercession. In response to Josel, Luther referred to his unsuccessful attempts to convert the Jews: "... I would willingly do my best for your people but I will not contribute to your [Jewish] obstinacy by my own kind actions. You must find another intermediary with my good lord." Heiko Oberman notes this event as significant in Luther's attitude toward the Jews: "Even today this refusal is often judged to be the decisive turning point in Luther's career from friendliness to hostility toward the Jews."

In a paragraph from his On the Jews and Their Lies (1543) he deplores Christendom's failure to expel them. Moreover, he proposed "What shall we Christians do with this rejected and condemned people, the Jews":

- "First, to set fire to their synagogues or schools ... This is to be done in honor of our Lord and of Christendom, so that God might see that we are Christians ..."
- "Second, I advise that their houses also be razed and destroyed."
- "Third, I advise that all their prayer books and Talmudic writings, in which such idolatry, lies, cursing, and blasphemy are taught, be taken from them."
- "Fourth, I advise that their rabbis be forbidden to teach henceforth on pain of loss of life and limb ..."
- "Fifth, I advise that safe-conduct on the highways be abolished completely for the Jews. For they have no business in the countryside ..."
- "Sixth, I advise that usury be prohibited to them, and that all cash and treasure of silver and gold be taken from them ..."
- "Seventh, I recommend putting a flail, an ax, a hoe, a spade, a distaff, or a spindle into the hands of young, strong Jews and Jewesses and letting them earn their bread in the sweat of their brow ... But if we are afraid that they might harm us or our wives, children, servants, cattle, etc., ... then let us emulate the common sense of other nations such as France, Spain, Bohemia, etc., ... then eject them forever from the country ..."

Rabbi Josel of Rosheim, who tried to help the Jews of Saxony, wrote in his memoir that their situation was "due to that priest whose name was Martin Luther — may his body and soul be bound up in hell!! — who wrote and issued many heretical books in which he said that whoever would help the Jews was doomed to perdition." Robert Michael, Professor Emeritus of European History at the University of Massachusetts Dartmouth writes that Josel asked the city of Strasbourg to forbid the sale of Luther's anti-Jewish works; they refused initially, but relented when a Lutheran pastor in Hochfelden argued in a sermon that his parishioners should murder Jews.

== Anti-Jewish works ==
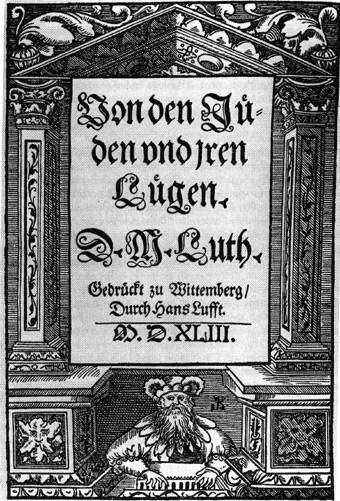
Title page of Martin Luther's On the Jews and Their Lies. Wittenberg, 1543

Luther's main works on the Jews were his 65,000-word treatise Von den Juden und Ihren Lügen ('On the Jews and Their Lies') and Vom Schem Hamphoras und vom Geschlecht Christi ('Of the Unknowable Name and the Generations of Christ') — reprinted five times within his lifetime — both written in 1543, three years before his death. It is believed that Luther was influenced by Anton Margaritha's book Der gantze Jüdisch Glaub ('The Whole Jewish Belief'). Margaritha, a convert to Christianity who had become a Lutheran, published his antisemitic book in 1530 which was read by Luther in 1539. In 1539, Luther got his hands on the book and immediately became fond of it: "The materials provided in this book confirmed for Luther that the Jews in their blindness wanted nothing to do with faith and justification through faith." Margaritha's book was decisively discredited by Josel of Rosheim in a public debate in 1530 before Charles V and his court, resulting in Margaritha's expulsion from the Empire.

=== Commentary on the Psalms ===
Martin Luther was a young professor of theology at the time when he wrote his commentary on the first 22 Psalms; his ideas about reformation were still nascent. The work is written in Latin. It was first translated to English by the Reverend Henry Cole with the title, Complete Commentary on the First Twenty-Two Psalms Two Volumes, and published by W. Simpkin and R. Marshall (printed by T. Bensley), in London in 1826. It was further expanded, enlarged, and updated in 1903 by John Nicholas Lenker.

Psalm 2 focuses on David as the true King set in Zion (Psalm 2:6). Luther's interpretation of Psalms 1 through 8 was similar to other medieval commentaries: Literal prophecies of Christ's life, death, and resurrection, instead of the historical context of those Psalms, about the life of David. In Psalm 2, "Luther viewed the kings and princes as the Jews, the enemies of Christ. The Messiah will "speak to them in his wrath" (Psalm 2:5) and "break them with a rod of iron" (Psalm 2:11)."

=== On the Jews and Their Lies ===
In 1543, Luther published On the Jews and Their Lies in which he says that the Jews are a "base, whoring people, that is, no people of God, and their boast of lineage, circumcision, and law must be accounted as filth." The synagogue was a "defiled bride, yes, an incorrigible whore and an evil slut ..." He argues that their synagogues and schools be set on fire, their prayer books destroyed, rabbis forbidden to preach, homes razed, and property and money confiscated. They should be shown no mercy or kindness, afforded no legal protection, and these "poisonous envenomed worms" should be drafted into forced labor or expelled for all time. He also seems to advocate their murder, writing "[w]e are at fault in not slaying them". Luther claims that Jewish history was "assailed by much heresy", and that Christ swept away the Jewish heresy and goes on to do so, "as it still does daily before our eyes." He stigmatizes Jewish Prayer as being "blasphemous" and a lie, and vilifies Jews in general as being spiritually "blind" and "surely possessed by devils." Martin Luther appears to advocate that Jews be slain in On the Jews and Their Lies; in his own words:

"...God has struck [the Jews] with 'madness and blindness and confusion of mind' [Deuteronomy 28:28]. So we are even at fault in not avenging all this innocent blood of our Lord and of the Christians which they shed for three hundred years after the destruction of Jerusalem... We are at fault in not slaying them.

=== Vom Schem Hamphoras ===
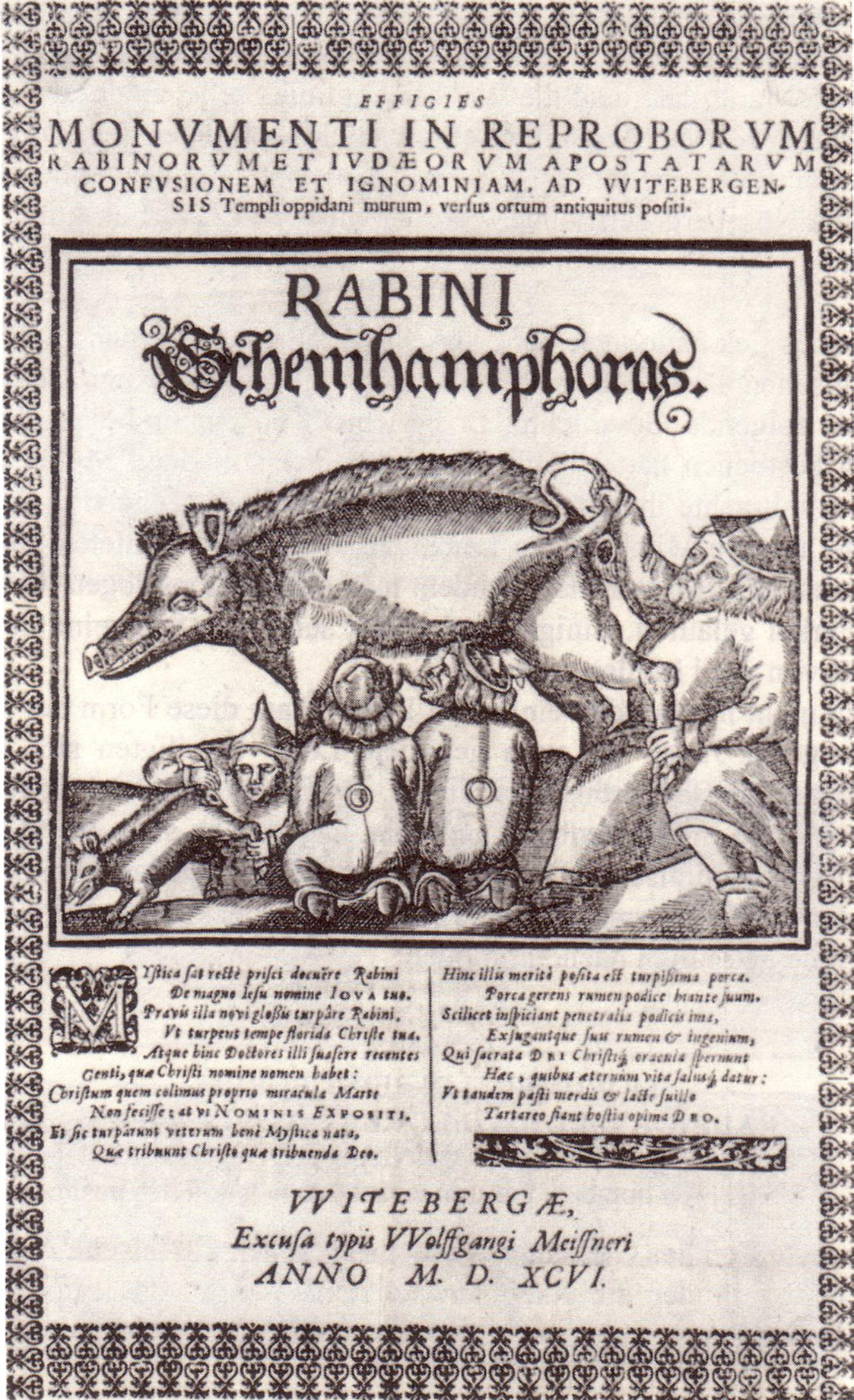
1596 reprint of Vom Schem Hamphoras

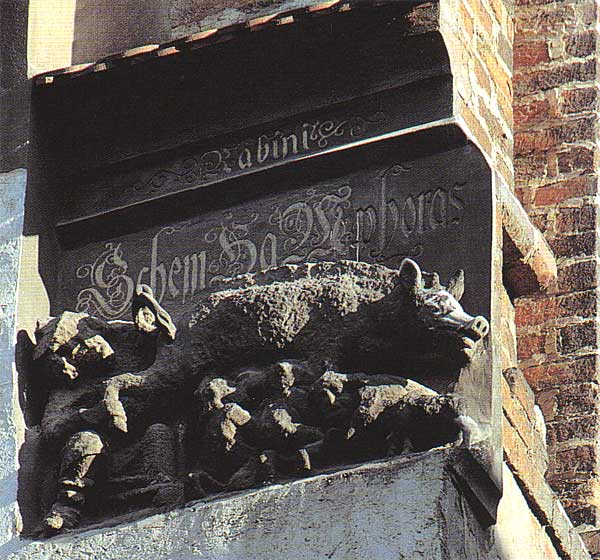
Judensau on the Wittenberg Church, built 1300–1470. The imagery of Jews in contact with pigs or representing the devil was common in Germany.

Several months after publishing On the Jews and Their Lies, Luther wrote the 125-page Vom Schem Hamphoras und vom Geschlecht Christi ('Of the Unknowable Name and the Generations of Christ'), in which he equated Jews with the Devil:

Here in Wittenburg, in our parish church, there is a sow carved into the stone under which lie young pigs and Jews who are sucking; behind the sow stands a rabbi who is lifting up the right leg of the sow, raises behind the sow, bows down and looks with great effort into the Talmud under the sow, as if he wanted to read and see something most difficult and exceptional; no doubt they gained their Shem Hamphoras from that place.

The English translation of Vom Schem Hamphoras is contained in The Jew in Christian Theology, by Gerhard Falk (1992).

=== Warning against the Jews ===
Shortly before his death on 18 February 1546, Luther preached four sermons in Eisleben. He appended to the second to the last what he called his "final warning" against the Jews. The main point of this short work is that authorities who could expel the Jews from their lands should do so if they would not convert to Christianity. Otherwise, Luther indicated, such authorities would make themselves "partners in another's sins".

Luther began by saying:

We want to deal with them in a Christian manner now. Offer them the Christian faith that they would accept the Messiah, who is even their cousin and has been born of their flesh and blood; and is rightly Abraham's Seed, of which they boast. Even so, I am concerned [that] Jewish blood may no longer become watery and wild. First of all, you should propose to them that they be converted to the Messiah and allow themselves to be baptized, that one may see that this is a serious matter to them. If not, then we would not permit them [to live among us], for Christ commands us to be baptized and believe in Him, even though we cannot now believe so strongly as we should, God is still patient with us.

Luther continued, "However, if they are converted, abandon their usury, and receive Christ, then we will willingly regard them our brothers. Otherwise, nothing will come out of it, for they do it to excess." Luther followed this with accusations:

They are our public enemies. They do not stop blaspheming our Lord Christ, calling the Virgin Mary a whore, Christ, a bastard, and us changelings or abortions (Mahlkälber: "meal calves"). If they could kill us all, they would gladly do it. They do it often, especially those who pose as physicians—though sometimes they help—for the devil helps to finish it in the end. They can also practice medicine as in French Switzerland. They administer poison to someone from which he could die in an hour, a month, a year, ten or twenty years. They are able to practice this art.

He then said:

Yet, we will show them Christian love and pray for them that they may be converted to receive the Lord, whom they should honor properly before us. Whoever will not do this is no doubt a malicious Jew, who will not stop blaspheming Christ, draining you dry, and, if he can, killing [you].

This work has been newly translated and published in volume 58 (Sermons V) of Luther's Works, pages 458–459.

== The influence of Luther's views ==
In 1543, Luther's prince, John Frederick I, Elector of Saxony, revoked concessions he had made to the Jews in 1539. Luther's influence persisted after his death. John of Brandenburg-Küstrin, Margrave of the New March, repealed the safe conduct of Jews in his territories. Philip of Hesse added restrictions to his Order Concerning the Jews. Luther's followers sacked the synagogue of Berlin in 1572 and in the following year the Jews were driven out of the entire Margravate of Brandenburg. In the 1580s riots led to the expulsion of Jews from several German Lutheran states.

Nevertheless, no ruler enacted all of Luther's anti-Jewish recommendations.

According to Michael, Luther's work acquired the status of Scripture within Germany, and he became the most widely read author of his generation, in part because of the coarse and passionate nature of the writing. In the 1570s Pastor Georg Nigrinus published Enemy Jew, which reiterated Luther's program in On the Jews and Their Lies, and Nikolaus Selnecker, one of the authors of the Formula of Concord, reprinted Luther's Against the Sabbatarians, On the Jews and Their Lies, and Vom Schem Hamphoras.

Luther's treatises against the Jews were reprinted again early in the 17th century at Dortmund, where they were seized by the Emperor. In 1613 and 1617 they were published in Frankfurt am Main in support of the banishment of Jews from Frankfurt and Worms. Vincenz Fettmilch, a Calvinist, reprinted On the Jews and Their Lies in 1612 to stir up hatred against the Jews of Frankfurt. Two years later, riots in Frankfurt saw the deaths of 3,000 Jews and the expulsion of the rest. Fettmilch was executed by the Lutheran city authorities, but Michael writes that his execution was for attempting to overthrow the authorities, not for his offenses against the Jews.

These reprints were the last popular publication of these works until they were revived in the 20th century.

== Influence on modern antisemitism ==
The prevailing view among historians is that Luther's anti-Jewish rhetoric contributed significantly to the development of antisemitism in Germany, and in the 1930s and 1940s provided an ideal foundation for the Nazi Party's attacks on Jews. Reinhold Lewin writes that "whoever wrote against the Jews for whatever reason believed he had the right to justify himself by triumphantly referring to Luther." According to Michael, just about every anti-Jewish book printed in the Third Reich contained references to and quotations from Luther. Diarmaid MacCulloch argues that Luther's 1543 pamphlet On the Jews and Their Lies was a "blueprint" for the Kristallnacht. Shortly after the Kristallnacht, Martin Sasse, Bishop of the Evangelical Lutheran Church in Thuringia, published a compendium of Luther's writings; Sasse "applauded the burning of the synagogues" and the coincidence of the day, writing in the introduction, "On November 10, 1938, on Luther's birthday, the synagogues are burning in Germany." The German people, he urged, ought to heed these words "of the greatest anti-Semite of his time, the warner of his people against the Jews."

Christopher J. Probst, in his book Demonizing the Jews: Luther and the Protestant Church in Nazi Germany (2012), shows that a large number of German Protestant clergy and theologians during the Nazi Third Reich used Luther's hostile publications towards the Jews and their Jewish religion to justify at least in part the antisemitic policies of the National Socialists. Published In 1940, Heinrich Himmler wrote admiringly of Luther's writings and sermons on the Jews. The city of Nuremberg presented the first edition of On the Jews and their Lies to Julius Streicher, editor of the Nazi newspaper Der Stürmer, on his birthday in 1937; the newspaper described it as the most radically antisemitic tract ever published. It was publicly exhibited in a glass case at the Nuremberg rallies and quoted in a 54-page explanation of the Aryan Law by Dr. E.H. Schulz and Dr. R. Frercks. On December 17, 1941, seven Lutheran regional church confederations issued a statement agreeing with the policy of forcing Jews to wear the yellow badge, "since after his bitter experience Luther had [strongly] suggested preventive measures against the Jews and their expulsion from German territory."

Michael states "Luther wrote of the Jews as if they were a race that could not truly convert to Christianity. Indeed, like so many Christian writers before him, Luther, by making the Jews the devil's people, put them beyond conversion." He notes that in a sermon of September 25, 1539, "Luther tried to demonstrate through several examples that individual Jews could not convert permanently, and in several passages of The Jews and Their Lies, Luther appeared to reject the possibility that the Jews would or could convert."

Franklin Sherman, editor of volume 47 of the American Edition of Luther's Works in which On the Jews and Their Lies appears, responds to the claim that "Luther's antipathy towards the Jews was religious rather than racial in nature," Luther's writings against the Jews, he explains, are not "merely a set of cool, calm and collected theological judgments. His writings are full of rage, and indeed hatred, against an identifiable human group, not just against a religious point of view; it is against that group that his action proposals are directed." Sherman argues that Luther "cannot be distanced completely from modern antisemites". Regarding Luther's treatise, On the Jews and Their Lies, the German philosopher Karl Jaspers wrote: "There you already have the whole Nazi program".

Other scholars assert that Luther's antisemitism as expressed in On the Jews and Their Lies is based on religion. Bainton asserts that Luther's position was "entirely religious and in no respect racial. The supreme sin for him was the persistent rejection of God's revelation of himself in Christ. The centuries of Jewish suffering were themselves a mark of divine displeasure. They should be compelled to leave and go to a land of their own. This was a program of enforced Zionism. But if it were not feasible, then Luther would recommend that the Jews be compelled to live from the soil. He was unwittingly proposing a return to the condition of the early Middle Ages when the Jews had been in agriculture. Forced off the land, they had gone into commerce and, having been expelled from commerce, into money lending. Luther wished to reverse the process and thereby inadvertently would accord the Jews a more secure position than they enjoyed in his day."

Paul Halsall argues that Luther's views had a part in laying the groundwork for the racial European antisemitism of the nineteenth century. He writes that "although Luther's comments seem to be proto-Nazi, they are better seen as part of tradition [sic] of Medieval Christian anti-semitism. While there is little doubt that Christian anti-semitism laid the social and cultural basis for modern anti-semitism, modern anti-semitism does differ in being based on pseudo-scientific notions of race. The Nazis imprisoned and killed even those ethnic Jews who had converted to Christianity: Luther would have welcomed their conversions."

In his Lutheran Quarterly article, Wallmann argued that Luther's On the Jews and Their Lies, Against the Sabbabitarians, and Vom Schem Hamphoras were largely ignored by antisemites of the late eighteenth and early nineteenth centuries. He contended that Johann Andreas Eisenmenger and his Judaism Unmasked, published posthumously in 1711, was "a major source of evidence for the anti-Semites of the nineteenth and twentieth centuries" and "cast Luther's anti-Jewish writings into obscurity". In this 2000-page tome, Eisenmenger makes no mention of Luther at all.

The Lutheran court chaplain to Kaiser Wilhelm I, Adolf Stoecker, founded in 1878 an antisemitic and antiliberal party called the Christian Social Party (Germany). However, this party did not enjoy the mass support which the Nazis received during the 1930s when the Great Depression hit Germany especially hard.

== Debate about Luther's influence on the Nazis ==
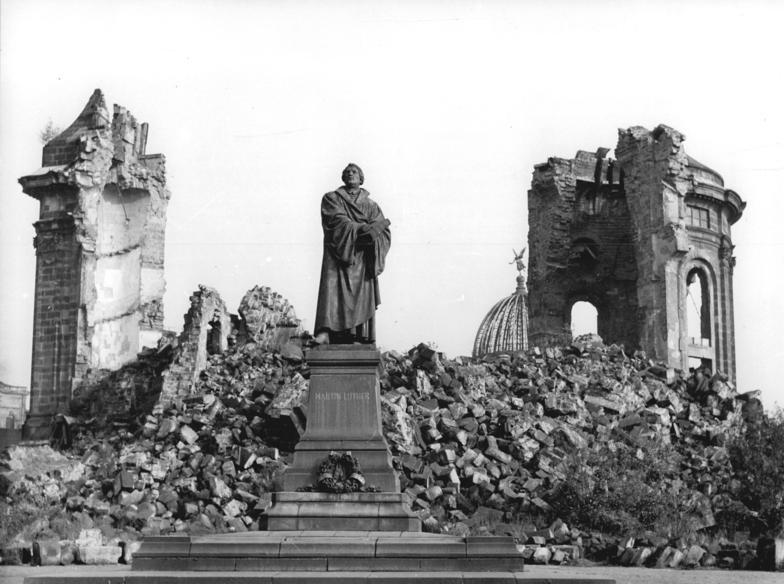
Statue of Martin Luther in The Ruins of Dresden in the aftermath of The Second World War

At the heart of the debate about Luther's influence is whether or not it is anachronistic to view his work as a precursor of the racial antisemitism of the Nazis. Some scholars believe that Luther's influence is limited, and they believe that the Nazis' use of his work was opportunistic.

The prevailing scholarly view since the Second World War is that the treatise exercised a major and persistent influence on Germany's attitude toward its Jewish citizens in the centuries between the Reformation and the Holocaust. Four hundred years after it was written, the Nazi Party displayed On the Jews and Their Lies during Nuremberg rallies, and the city of Nuremberg presented a first edition to Julius Streicher, editor of the Nazi newspaper Der Stürmer, the newspaper describing it as the most radically antisemitic tract ever published. Against this view, theologian Johannes Wallmann writes that the treatise had no continuity of influence in Germany, and was largely ignored during the 18th and 19th centuries.

Martin Brecht argues that there is a world of difference between Luther's belief in salvation, which depended on the belief that Jesus was the messiah—a belief that Luther criticized the Jews for rejecting—and the Nazis' ideology of racial antisemitism. Johannes Wallmann argues that Luther's writings against the Jews were largely ignored in the 18th and 19th centuries, and he also argues that there is no continuity between Luther's thought and Nazi ideology. Uwe Siemon-Netto agrees, arguing that the Nazis republished Luther's writings because they were already antisemites. Hans J. Hillerbrand states that the view that "Luther significantly encouraged the development of German anti-Semitism ... puts far too much emphasis on Luther and not enough on the larger peculiarities of German history". Other scholars argue that, even if his views were merely anti-Judaic, their violence lent a new element to the standard Christian suspicion of Judaism. Ronald Berger writes that Luther is credited with "Germanizing the Christian critique of Judaism and establishing anti-Semitism as a key element of German culture and national identity." Paul Rose argues that he caused a "hysterical and demonizing mentality" about Jews to enter German thought and discourse, a mentality that might otherwise have been absent.

The line of "anti-semitic descent" from Luther to Hitler is "easy to draw", according to American historian Lucy Dawidowicz. In her book The War Against the Jews, 1933–1945, she writes that both Luther and Hitler were obsessed with the "demonologized universe" which they believed was inhabited by Jews, with Hitler asserting that the later Luther, the author of On the Jews and Their Lies, was the 'real' Luther.

Dawidowicz writes that the similarities between Luther's anti-Jewish writings and modern antisemitism are no coincidence because they derived from a common history of Judenhass, which can be traced back to Haman's advice to Ahasuerus. Although modern German antisemitism also has its roots in German nationalism and Christian antisemitism, she argues that another foundation of it was laid by the Roman Catholic Church, "upon which Luther built". Michael has argued that Luther scholars who try to tone down Luther's views on the Jews ignore the murderous implications of his antisemitism. Michael argues that there is a "strong parallel" between Luther's ideas and the antisemitism of most German Lutherans throughout the Holocaust. He writes that Like the Nazis, Luther mythologized the Jews as evil. They could only be saved if they converted to Christianity, but their hostility to the idea made it inconceivable.

Luther's sentiments were widely echoed in the Germany of the 1930s, particularly within the Nazi party. Hitler's Education Minister, Bernhard Rust, was quoted by the Völkischer Beobachter as saying: "Since Martin Luther closed his eyes, no such son of our people has appeared again. It has been decided that we shall be the first to witness his reappearance ... I think the time is past when one may not say the names of Hitler and Luther in the same breath. They belong together; they are of the same old stamp [Schrot und Korn]".

Hans Hinkel, the editor of the Luther League's magazine Deutsche Kultur-Wacht, and the leader of the Berlin chapter of the Kampfbund, paid tribute to Luther in his acceptance speech as head of both the Jewish section and the film department of Joseph Goebbels's Chamber of Culture and Propaganda Ministry. "Through his acts and his spiritual attitude, he began the fight which we will wage today; with Luther, the revolution of German blood and feeling against alien elements of the Volk was begun. To continue and complete his Protestantism, nationalism must make the picture of Luther, of a German fighter, live as an example 'above the barriers of confession' for all German blood comrades."

According to Daniel Goldhagen, Bishop Martin Sasse, a leading Protestant churchman, published a compendium of Luther's writings shortly after Kristallnacht, for which Diarmaid MacCulloch, Professor of the History of the Church in the University of Oxford argued that Luther's writings were a "blueprint". Sasse "applauded the burning of the synagogues and the coincidence of the day, writing in the introduction, "On November 10, 1938, on Luther's birthday, the synagogues are burning in Germany." The German people, he urged, ought to heed these words "of the greatest antisemite of his time, the warner of his people against the Jews."

William Nichols, Professor of Religious Studies, recounts, "At his trial in Nuremberg after the Second World War, Julius Streicher, the notorious Nazi propagandist, editor of the scurrilous antisemitic weekly Der Stürmer, argued that if he should stand there and be arraigned on such charges, so should Martin Luther. After reading such passages, it is not hard to agree with him. Luther's proposals read like a program for the Nazis." It was Luther's expression "The Jews are our misfortune" that centuries later would be repeated by Heinrich von Treitschke and appear as a motto on the front page of Julius Streicher's Der Stürmer.

Some scholars have directly attributed the Nazi "Final Solution" to Martin Luther. Others dispute this point of view, pointedly taking issue with the thesis which was advanced by William L. Shirer and others.

=== Luthertag ===
In the course of the Luthertag (Luther Day) festivities, the Nazis emphasized their connection to Luther as being both nationalist revolutionaries and the heirs of the German traditionalist past. An article in the Chemnitzer Tageblatt stated that "[t]he German Volk are united not only in loyalty and love for the Fatherland, but also once more in the old German beliefs of Luther [Lutherglauben]; a new epoch of strong, conscious religious life has dawned in Germany." Richard Steigmann-Gall writes in his 2003 book The Holy Reich: Nazi Conceptions of Christianity, 1919–1945:

The leadership of the Protestant League espoused a similar view. Fahrenhorst, who was on the planning committee of the Luthertag, called Luther "the first German spiritual Führer" who spoke to all Germans regardless of clan or confession. In a letter to Hitler, Fahrenhorst reminded him that his "Old Fighters" were mostly Protestants and he also wrote that it was precisely in the Protestant regions of our Fatherland" in which Nazism found its greatest strength. Promising that the celebration of Luther's birthday would not turn into a confessional affair, Fahrenhorst invited Hitler to become the official patron of the Luthertag. In subsequent correspondences, Fahrenhorst repeatedly voiced the notion that reverence for Luther could somehow cross confessional boundaries: "Luther is truly not only the founder of a Christian confession; much more, his ideas had a fruitful impact on all Christianity in Germany." Precisely because of Luther's political as well as religious significance, the Luthertag would serve as a confession both "to church and Volk."

Fahrenhorst's claim that the Nazis found their greatest strength in the Protestant areas of Germany has been corroborated by scholars who have studied the voting patterns of Germany from 1928 to 1933. Richard (Dick) Geary, Professor of Modern History at the University of Nottingham in England and the author of Hitler and Nazism (Routledge 1993) wrote an article about the people who voted for the Nazis in History Today, in which he pointed out that the Nazis gained disproportionately more votes in Protestant than Catholic areas of Germany.

== Luther's words and scholarship ==
In his book The Rise and Fall of the Third Reich, Shirer wrote:

It is difficult to understand the behavior of most German Protestants in the first Nazi years unless one is aware of two things: their history and the influence of Martin Luther. The great founder of Protestantism was both a passionate anti-Semite and a ferocious believer in absolute obedience to political authority. He wanted Germany rid of the Jews. Luther's advice was literally followed four centuries later by Hitler, Goering and Himmler.

Roland Bainton, noted church historian and Luther biographer, wrote with reference to On the Jews and Their Lies: "One could wish that Luther had died before ever this tract was written. His position was entirely religious and in no respect racial." Richard Marius contends that in making this "declaration," "Roland Bainton's effort is directed towards trying 'to make the best of Luther,' and 'Luther's view of the Jews.'"

Bainton's view is later echoed by James M. Kittelson writing about Luther's correspondence with Jewish scholar Josel of Rosheim: "There was no anti-Semitism in this response. Moreover, Luther never became an anti-Semite in the modern, racial sense of the term."

Paul Halsall states, "In his Letters to Spalatin, we can already see that Luther's hatred of Jews, best seen in this 1543 letter On the Jews and Their Lies, was not some affectation of old age, but was present very early on. Luther expected Jews to convert to his purified Christianity. When they did not, he turned violently against them."

Gordon Rupp gives this evaluation of On the Jews and Their Lies: "I confess that I am ashamed as I am ashamed of some letters of St. Jerome, some paragraphs in Sir Thomas More, and some chapters in the Book of Revelation, and, must say, as of a deal else in Christian history, that their authors had not so learned Christ."

According to Heiko Oberman, "[t]he basis of Luther's anti-Judaism was the conviction that ever since Christ's appearance on earth, the Jews have had no more future as Jews."

Richard Marius views Luther's remarks as part of a pattern of similar statements about various groups Luther viewed as enemies of Christianity. He states:

Although the Jews for him were only one among many enemies he castigated with equal fervor, although he did not sink to the horrors of the Spanish Inquisition against Jews, and although he was certainly not to blame for Adolf Hitler, Luther's hatred of the Jews is a sad and dishonorable part of his legacy, and it is not a fringe issue. It lay at the center of his concept of religion. He saw in the Jews a continuing moral depravity he did not see in Catholics. He did not accuse papists of the crimes that he laid at the feet of Jews.

Robert Waite, in his psychohistory of Hitler and Nazi Germany, devoted an entire section to Luther's influence on Hitler and Nazi ideology. He noted that in Mein Kampf, Hitler referred to Luther as a great warrior, a true statesman, and a great reformer, alongside Richard Wagner and Frederick the Great. Waite cites Wilhelm Röpke, writing after Hitler's Holocaust, who concluded that "without any question, Lutheranism influenced the political, spiritual and social history of Germany in a way that, after careful consideration of everything, can be described only as fateful."

Waite also compared his psychoanalysis with Erik Erikson's own psychohistory of Luther, Young Man Luther, and concluded that, had Luther been alive during the 1930s, he most likely would have spoken out against Nazi persecution of Jews, even if this placed his life in danger, as Dietrich Bonhoeffer (a Lutheran pastor) did.

Martin Brecht in his extensive three-volume biography of Luther writes that "an evaluation of Luther's relationship with the Jews must be made." He observes,

[Luther's] opposition to the Jews, which ultimately was regarded as irreconcilable, was in its nucleus of a religious and theological nature that had to do with belief in Christ and justification, and it was associated with the understanding of the people of God and the interpretation of the Old Testament. Economic and social motives played only a subordinate role. Luther's animosity toward the Jews cannot be interpreted either in a psychological way as a pathological hatred or in a political way as an extension of the anti-Judaism of the territorial princes. But he certainly demanded that measures provided in the laws against heretics be employed to expel the Jews—similarly to their use against the Anabaptists—because, in view of the Jewish polemics against Christ, he saw no possibilities for religious coexistence. In advising the use of force, he advocated means that were essentially incompatible with his faith in Christ. In addition, his criticism of the rabbinic interpretation of the Scriptures in part violated his own exegetical principles. Therefore, his attitude toward the Jews can appropriately be criticized both for his methods and also from the center of his theology.

Brecht ends his evaluation:

Luther, however, was not involved with later racial anti-Semitism. There is a world of difference between his belief in salvation and a racial ideology. Nevertheless, his misguided agitation had the evil result that Luther fatefully became one of the "church fathers" of anti-Semitism and thus provided material for the modern hatred of the Jews, cloaking it with the authority of the Reformer.

In 1988, theologian Stephen Westerholm argued that Luther's attacks on Jews were part and parcel of his attack on the Catholic Church—that Luther was applying a Pauline critique of Phariseism as legalistic and hypocritical to the Catholic Church. Westerholm rejects Luther's interpretation of Judaism and his apparent antisemitism but points out that whatever problems exist in Paul's and Luther's arguments against Jews, what Paul, and later, Luther, were arguing for was and continues to be an important vision of Christianity.

Michael Berenbaum writes that Luther's reliance on the Bible as the sole source of Christian authority fed his later fury toward Jews over their rejection of Jesus as the Messiah. For Luther, salvation depended on the belief that Jesus was the son of God, a belief that adherents of Judaism do not share. Early in his life, Luther had argued that the Jews had been prevented from converting to Christianity by the proclamation of what he believed to be an impure gospel by the Catholic Church, and he believed they would respond favorably to the evangelical message if it were presented to them gently. He expressed concern for the poor conditions in which they were forced to live and insisted that anyone denying that Jesus was born a Jew was committing heresy.

Graham Noble writes that Luther wanted to save Jews, in his own terms, not exterminate them, but beneath his apparent reasonableness toward them, there was a "biting intolerance", which produced "ever more furious demands for their conversion to his own brand of Christianity" (Noble, 1–2). When they failed to convert, he turned on them.

In his commentary on the Magnificat, Luther is critical of the emphasis Judaism places on the Torah, the first five books of the Old Testament. He states that they "undertook to keep the law by their own strength, and failed to learn from it their needy and cursed state." Yet, he concludes that God's grace will continue for Jews as Abraham's descendants for all time, since they may always become Christians. "We ought...not to treat the Jews in so unkindly a spirit, for there are future Christians among them."

Paul Johnson writes that "Luther was not content with verbal abuse. Even before he wrote his anti-Semitic pamphlet, he got Jews expelled from Saxony in 1537, and in the 1540s he drove them from many German towns; he tried unsuccessfully to get the elector to expel them from Brandenburg in 1543."

Michael writes that Luther was concerned with the Jewish question all his life, despite devoting only a small proportion of his work to it. As a Christian pastor and theologian Luther was concerned that people have faith in Jesus as the messiah for salvation. In rejecting that view of Jesus, the Jews became the "quintessential other," a model of the opposition to the Christian view of God. In an early work, That Jesus Christ was born a Jew, Luther advocated kindness toward the Jews, but only to convert them to Christianity: what was called Judenmission. When his efforts at conversion failed, he became increasingly bitter toward them.

== Repudiation by Lutheran Churches ==
Along with antisemitism as a whole, On the Jews and Their Lies and Luther's other antisemitic writings have all been repudiated by various Lutheran churches throughout the world.

Strommen et al.'s 1970 survey of 4,745 North American Lutherans aged 15–65 found that, compared to the other minority groups that were under consideration, Lutherans were the least prejudiced towards Jews.

Since the 1980s, some Lutheran church bodies have formally denounced Luther's writings on the Jews and they have also disassociated themselves from them:

In 1982, the Lutheran World Federation issued a consultation which stated that "we Christians must purge ourselves of any hatred of the Jews and any sort of teaching of contempt for Judaism."

In 1983, The Lutheran Church–Missouri Synod denounced Luther's "hostile attitude" towards the Jews. At the same time, the LCMS in convention also rejected the use of Luther's statements to incite "anti-Lutheran sentiment".

The Evangelical Lutheran Church in America, in an essay on Lutheran-Jewish relations, observed that "Over the years, Luther's anti-Jewish writings have continued to be reproduced in pamphlets and other works by neo-Nazi and antisemitic groups, such as the Ku Klux Klan."

Writing in the Lutheran Quarterly in 1987, Dr. Johannes Wallmann stated:

The assertion that Luther's expressions of anti-Jewish sentiment have been of major and persistent influence in the centuries after the Reformation, and that there exists a continuity between Protestant anti-Judaism and modern racially oriented anti-Semitism, is at present wide-spread in the literature; since the Second World War it has understandably become the prevailing opinion.

In 1994, the Church Council of the Evangelical Lutheran Church in America publicly rejected Luther's antisemitic writings, saying "We who bear his name and heritage must acknowledge with pain the anti-Judaic diatribes contained in Luther's later writings. We reject this violent invective as did many of his companions in the sixteenth century, and we are moved to deep and abiding sorrow at its tragic effects on later generations of Jews."

In 1995 the Evangelical Lutheran Church in Canada made similar statements, as did the Austrian Evangelical Church in 1998. In the same year, the Land Synod of the Evangelical Lutheran Church in Bavaria, on the 60th anniversary of Kristallnacht, issued a declaration saying: "It is imperative for the Lutheran Church, which knows itself to be indebted to the work and tradition of Martin Luther, to take seriously also his anti-Jewish utterances, to acknowledge their theological function, and to reflect on their consequences. It has to distance itself from every [expression of] anti-Judaism in Lutheran theology."

A strong position statement was issued by The Lutheran Evangelical Protestant Church (LEPC) (GCEPC) saying, "The Jewish people are God's chosen people. Believers should bless them as scripture says that God will bless those who bless Israel and curse those who curse Israel. The LEPC/EPC/GCEPC recant and renounce the works and words of Martin Luther concerning the Jewish people. Prayer is offered for the healing of the Jewish people, their peace, and their prosperity. Prayer is offered for the peace of Jerusalem. With deep sorrow and regret, repentance is offered to the Jewish People for the harm that Martin Luther caused and any contribution to their harm. Forgiveness is requested of the Jewish People for these actions. The Gospel is to the Jew first and then the Gentile. Gentiles (believers in Christ other than Jews) have been grafted into the vine. In Christ, there is neither Jew nor Gentile but the Lord's desire is that there be one new man from the two for Christ broke down the wall of separation with His own body (Ephesians 2:14–15). The LEPC/EPC/GCEPC blesses Israel and the Jewish people."

The European Lutheran Commission on the Church and the Jewish People (Lutherische Europäische Kommission Kirche und Judentum), an umbrella organization representing twenty-five Lutheran church bodies in Europe, issued on May 12, 2003 A Response to Dabru Emet:

In its Driebergen Declaration (1991), the European Lutheran Commission on the Church and the Jewish People...rejected the traditional Christian "teaching of contempt" towards Jews and Judaism, and in particular, the anti-Jewish writings of Martin Luther, and it called for the reformation of church practice in the light of these insights. Against this background, LEKKJ welcomes the issuance of Dabru Emet: A Jewish Statement on Christians and Christianity. We see in this statement a confirmation of our own work of these past years....We know that we must reexamine themes in Lutheran theology that in the past have repeatedly given rise to enmity towards Jews....Fully aware that Dabru Emet is in the first instance an intra-Jewish invitation to conversation, we see in this statement also an aid to us in expressing and living out our faith in such a way that we do not denigrate Jews, but rather respect them in their otherness, and are enabled to give an account of our own identity more clearly as we scrutinize it in the light of how others see us.

On January 6, 2004, the Consultative Panel on Lutheran-Jewish Relations of the Evangelical Lutheran Church in America issued a statement urging any Lutheran church presenting a Passion Play to adhere to their Guidelines for Lutheran-Jewish Relations, stating that "the New Testament . . . must not be used as justification for hostility towards present-day Jews," and that "blame for the death of Jesus should not be attributed to Judaism or the Jewish people."

== See also ==
- Antisemitism in Christianity
- Christian–Jewish reconciliation
- Christianity and Judaism
- On War Against the Turk
- Religious antisemitism
- Supersessionism, also known as "Replacement Theology"
- Liber Vagatorum, with preface by Luther

== Bibliography ==
- Bainton, Roland. Here I Stand: A Life of Martin Luther. Nashville: Abingdon Press, 1978. ISBN 0-687-16894-5.
- Brecht, Martin. Martin Luther, 3 vols. Minneapolis: Fortress Press, 1985–1993. ISBN 0-8006-0738-4, ISBN 0-8006-2463-7, ISBN 0-8006-2704-0.
- Gavriel, Mardell J. The Anti-Semitism of Martin Luther: A Psychohistorical Exploration. Ph.D. diss., Chicago School of Professional Psychology, 1996.
- Goldhagen, Daniel. Hitler's Willing Executioners. Vintage, 1997. ISBN 0-679-77268-5.
- Halpérin, Jean, and Arne Sovik, eds. Luther, Lutheranism and the Jews: A Record of the Second Consultation between Representatives of The International Jewish Committee for Interreligious Consultation and the Lutheran World Federation Held in Stockholm, Sweden, 11–13 July 1983. Geneva: LWF, 1984.
- Johnson, Paul. A History of the Jews. New York: HarperCollins Publishers, 1987. ISBN 0-06-091533-1.
- Kaennel, Lucie. Luther était-il antisémite? (Luther: Was He an Antisemite?). Entrée Libre N° 38. Geneva: Labor et Fides, 1997. ISBN 2-8309-0869-4.
- Kittelson, James M. Luther the Reformer: The Story of the Man and His Career. Minneapolis: Augsburg Publishing House, 1986. ISBN 0-8066-2240-7.
- Luther, Martin. "On the Jews and Their Lies, 1543". Martin H. Bertram, trans. In Luther's Works. Philadelphia: Fortress Press, 1971. 47:137–306.
- McGovern, William Montgomery (1 January 1941). From Luther to Hitler: The History of Fascist-Nazi Political Philosophy (1st ed.). Houghton Mifflin.
- Oberman, Heiko A. The Roots of Anti-Semitism in the Age of Renaissance and Reformation. James I. Porter, trans. Philadelphia: Fortress Press, 1984. ISBN 0-8006-0709-0.
- Probst, Christopher J. "Demonizing the Jews: Luther and the Protestant Church in Nazi Germany", Indiana University Press in association with the United States Holocaust Memorial Museum, 2012, ISBN 978-0-253-00100-9.
- Rosenberg, Elliot, But Were They Good for the Jews? (New York: Birch Lane Press, 1997). ISBN 1-55972-436-6.
- Roynesdal, Olaf. Martin Luther and the Jews. Ph.D. diss., Marquette University, 1986.
- Rupp, Gordon. Martin Luther: Hitler's Cause or Cure? In Reply to Peter F. Wiener. London: Lutterworth Press, 1945.
- Siemon-Netto, Uwe. The Fabricated Luther: the Rise and Fall of the Shirer Myth. Peter L. Berger, Foreword. St. Louis: Concordia Publishing House, 1995. ISBN 0-570-04800-1.
- Siemon-Netto, Uwe. "Luther and the Jews". The Lutheran Witness 123 (2004)No. 4:16–19. (PDF)
- Steigmann-Gall, Richard. The Holy Reich: Nazi Conceptions of Christianity, 1919–1945. Cambridge University Press, 2003. ISBN 0-521-82371-4.
- Tjernagel, Neelak S. Martin Luther and the Jewish People. Milwaukee: Northwestern Publishing House, 1985. ISBN 0-8100-0213-2.
- Wallmann, Johannes. "The Reception of Luther's Writings on the Jews from the Reformation to the End of the 19th Century." Lutheran Quarterly 1 (Spring 1987) 1:72–97.
- Westerholm, Stephen. Israel's Law and the Church's Faith: Paul and His Recent Interpreters. Grand Rapids: Eerdmans, 1988.
- Wiener, Peter F. Martin Luther: Hitler's Spiritual Ancestor, Hutchinson & Co. (Publishers) Ltd., 1945;
