= Josel of Rosheim =

German rabbi and community leader (1470s–1554)

- יוסף בן גרשון איש רוסהיים
- Born: c. 1476–1480; Haguenau, France
- Died: March 1554; Rosheim, France
- Known for: the great advocate ("shtadlan") of the German and Polish Jews
- Relatives: Jacob ben Jehiel Loans; Elijah Loans (grandson)

Josel of Rosheim (alternatively: Joselin, Joselmann, Yoselmann, German: Josel von Rosheim, Hebrew: יוסף בן גרשון מרוסהים Joseph ben Gershon mi-Rosheim, or Joseph ben Gershon Loanz; c. 1476–1480 – March 1554) was a German rabbi and community leader. He was the great advocate ("shtadlan") of the German and Polish Jews during the reigns of the Holy Roman emperors Maximilian I and Charles V. Maximilian I appointed him as governor of all Jews of Germany, a position which was confirmed after Maximilian's death by his grandson, Charles V.

His stature among the Jews, and the protected status he gained for himself and for the Jews within the Holy Roman Empire, rested in part on his skills as an advocate and in part from the Jewish role in financing the expenses of the emperor. Josel of Rosheim remains a major figure of the History of Jews in Alsace.

== Family background ==
One of his ancestors was Jacob ben Jehiel Loans, personal physician to Emperor Frederick III, ennobled for his medical achievements, and also Hebrew teacher of the well-known humanist, lawyer and philosopher Johannes Reuchlin.

Despite the favor shown to this ancestor, his family history also shows the precarious position of Jews during this era. In 1470, three of his father's brothers, including Rabbi Elias, were prosecuted in Endingen, brought before the emperor on charges that eight years earlier, when they were falsely accused of having performed a ritual murder at Sukkot.

Also in 1470, Josel's father, Gerschon, settled in Oberehnheim (Obernai). In 1476, along with the entire Jewish community of that town, the family fled (pursued by Swiss mercenaries) to Haguenau, where Josel was born, possibly as early as that same year.

== Early life ==
Nothing is known of Josel's childhood or youth. As a young man, he was a rabbi at the court of the Lower Alsatian Jewry, and made a living as a merchant and money lender. These three occupations would remain constants in his life.

While still young, he worked for the welfare of his coreligionists, and, reportedly, was instrumental in thwarting the hostile plans of Johannes Pfefferkorn, a converted Jew who turned antisemite. In 1507, at the time of the expulsion of the Jews from Colmar, a similar attempt was made at Oberehnheim. Josel successfully appealed to the imperial officials, and the Jews of Oberehnheim were allowed to remain.

Soon after, in arguing for the right of Jews to participate in the market at Colmar, he invoked the Roman juridical concept of "civibus Romanis" (Roman citizenry) to argue that Jews, like Christians, should have free access to all markets in the realm.

In 1510, he was made by the Jewish communities of Lower Alsace their parnas u-manhig (sworn guide and leader), a title that he originally shared with Rabbi Zadoc Parnas. As such he had "to keep his eyes open in special care of the community," and possessed the right to issue enactments for the Jews of his district and to put under the ban (cherem, the equivalent of excommunication) refractory members. On the other hand, he had to defend individuals and communities against oppression, and, if necessary, to appeal to the government and to the emperor. During the first years of his public activity Josel lived in the town of Mittelbergheim. In 1514 he, with other Jews of this place, was accused of having profaned the consecrated host, and was put in prison for several months, until his innocence was established. Soon afterward Josel moved to Rosheim, Alsace, in which place he remained until his death.

In 1515–1516, he aided his oppressed brethren in Oberehnheim by bringing their complaints personally before the emperor Maximilian I and obtaining a special imperial safe-conduct for them.

== Advocate of the German Jews ==
Becoming steadily better known, even beyond the borders of Alsace, as a defender of Jewish communities in religious and legal matters, Josel gradually acquired a status as an advocate, and even leader ("Befehlshaber") of all the Jews in the German empire also having the title of Imperial governor. His status was not absolute: on one occasion he was fined for styling himself "Regierer der gemeinen Jüdischkeit", "ruler of the Jewry".

Soon after Charles V ascended the throne at Aachen in 1520, Josel procured a charter or letter of protection from him for the whole German Jewry, confirmed ten years later in the Edict of Innsbruck, May 18, 1530. Several times he interceded successfully with King Ferdinand, brother of the emperor, in favor of the Jews of Bohemia and Moravia.

During the German Peasants' War, in 1525, the peasants of Alsace had decided to storm the city of Rosheim. With the peasants drawn up at the city gates, Protestant reformers Wolfgang Capito and Martin Bucer (or Butzer) failed to dissuade them from their plans, but after lengthy discussions, Josel convinced them to leave the city and its Jews in peace. This stood in stark contrast to Sundgau, where the peasants had all of the Jews driven from the city.

In 1530, in the presence of the emperor and his court at Augsburg, Josel had a public disputation with the baptized Jew Antonius Margaritha, who had published a pamphlet Der gantze Jüdisch Glaub (The Whole Jewish Belief) full of libelous accusations against Judaism. The disputation terminated in a decided victory for Josel, who obtained Margaritha's expulsion from the realm. (Despite this legal decision, this work would be repeatedly reprinted and cited by antisemites over the coming centuries).

At this same Reichstag, Josel defended the Jews against the strange accusation that they had been the cause of the apostasy of the Lutherans. Josel's most important action at the Reichstag of Augsburg was the settlement of rules for business transactions of the Jews. They were forbidden to exact too high a rate of interest, to call a negligent debtor before a foreign court of justice, etc. Josel announced these articles to the German Jews as "governor of the Jewish community in Germany", by means of takkanot, a rabbinical decree or ordinance, issued to improve and preserve religious life with the power of Jewish law.

== In Bohemia ==
While still occupied with the Augsburg articles, Josel had to hurry to the court of Charles V of Brabant and Flanders in order to defend the calumniated German Jews there (1531). In this to him most inhospitable country—for no Jews were living there then—he spent three months, occupying himself, when he was not officially engaged, with Hebrew language studies. Though his life was once in danger, he succeeded in attaining the object of his journey. At the Reichstag of Regensburg (1532) he tried in vain to dissuade the proselyte Solomon Molko from carrying out his fantastic plan to arm the German Jews and to offer them as a help to the emperor in his wars with the Turks. Molko did not follow Josel's advice, and soon after was burned as a heretic. In 1534 Josel went to Bohemia to make peace between the Jews of Prague and those of the small Bohemian town of Hořovice (Horowitz). He succeeded in his mission, but the Jews of Horowitz plotted against his life, and he had to seek refuge in the Prague Castle.

In 1535, Josel traveled to Brandenburg-Ansbach to intercede with the margrave Georg in favor of the Jews of Krnov (Jägerndorf), who had been falsely accused and thrown into prison; and he obtained their freedom. Two years later Josel tried to help the Saxon Jews, who were threatened with expulsion by John Frederick I, Elector of Saxony. He went to Saxony with letters of high recommendation to that prince from the magistrate of Strasbourg and to Martin Luther from the Alsatian reformer Capito. But Luther had become embittered against the Jews on account of their faithfulness to their creed, and he refused every intercession, so that Josel did not obtain even an audience with the elector. But at a meeting in Frankfurt (1539) he found occasion to speak to the prince, whose attention he attracted by refuting, in a public dispute with the reformer Bucer, some spiteful assertions about the Jews. In the same Reichstag Philipp Melanchthon proved the innocence of the thirty-eight Jews who had been burned in Berlin in 1510, and this helped to induce Kurfürst Joachim of Brandenburg to grant Josel's request. The Elector of Saxony then also repealed his order of expulsion.

Josel wrote in his memoir that their situation was "due to that priest whose name was Martin Luther — may his body and soul be bound up in hell!! — who wrote and issued many heretical books in which he said that whoever would help the Jews was doomed to perdition." Michael writes that Josel asked the city of Strasbourg to forbid the sale of Luther's anti-Jewish works; they refused initially, but relented when a Lutheran pastor in Hochfelden argued in a sermon that his parishioners should murder Jews.

== Refutation of Luther's charges ==
The same year Josel heard that the Hessian Jews had to suffer many persecutions because of a pamphlet by Bucer. He therefore wrote a defense of Judaism in Hebrew, to be read in synagogue every Sabbath for the comfort of his coreligionists. The magistrate of Strasbourg having expressed the belief that attacks on Christianity were contained in the defense, Josel had a verbatim translation made and sent to him. Soon Josel had to defend the Jews against the attacks of Luther himself, who in 1543 had published a very spiteful pamphlet, titled Von den Juden und Ihren Lügen (On the Jews and Their Lies), which had led to harsh treatment of Jews in various Protestant districts. Josel refuted Luther's assertions in a voluminous petition to the magistrate of Strasbourg, and the latter thereupon inhibited a new edition of Luther's book. In 1541 Josel appeared as "chief of the Jews in the German lands" at the Reichstag of Regensburg, and succeeded in averting a dangerous edict which would have forbidden the Jews to engage in any monetary transaction. In April 1544 he succeeded at the Reichstag (imperial diet) of Speyer in obtaining a Great Privilege of the Jews from the emperor, wherein they were expressly allowed to charge a much higher rate of interest than the Christians, on the ground that they had to pay much higher taxes than the latter, though all handicrafts and the cultivation of land were prohibited to them. At the same time Josel paid to the emperor in the name of the German Jews a contribution of 3,000 florins toward the expenses of the French war (the French having at this time allied with the Turks). In the Speyer letter of protection, referred to above, the emperor disapproved of the accusation of ritual murder, and he ordained that no Jew should be put in prison or sentenced for this crime without sufficient proof. Josel was anxious to obtain this order because in 1543 at Würzburg five Jews accused of ritual murder had been imprisoned and tortured. After having personally interceded in favor of these prisoners Josel at length obtained their pardon from the emperor.

In July 1543, Rabbi Josel wrote a Letter to the Strasbourg City Council which offered a defense against Martin Luther's attacks on the Talmud. The letter requested that the Council assist Josel in advocating on behalf of the Jews in Saxony and Hesse, and to stop printing Luther's antisemitic tracts. The Council refused to advocate for the Jews but they did agree to cease printing Luther's writings in the city of Strasbourg.

In 1546, Josel was called upon to interfere in behalf of the whole body of German Jews, who suffered much during the Smalkaldic war. Through Granvella, the influential counselor of the emperor, Josel obtained an imperial order to the army and a mandate to the Christian population in favor of the Jews, so that they were not molested in the course of the war. As a proof of their gratitude Josel caused the Jews to provide the imperial army with victuals wherever it passed. In recognition of the great services rendered by Josel to the emperor on this occasion and previously, Charles V renewed at Augsburg in 1548 the safe-conduct for Josel and his family, which thereby received the right of free passage throughout the German empire and free residence wherever Jews were allowed to live. Josel's life as well as all of his belongings was thus protected by a special imperial order. Even in the last years of his life Josel was able to make himself useful to Charles V. In 1552 he sent to the emperor at Innsbruck by a special messenger a warning that Elector Moritz of Saxony intended to invade Tyrol, and the emperor was thus enabled at the last moment to effect his escape.

== Death ==
Josel worked for the welfare of his people to the last, however, it is not known exactly when he died except that he was alive in 1555 but died shortly after. He is believed to have died in Rosheim, although there is no written record of his death, nor does a tombstone survive. No successor was able to win as favorable of a status for the German Jews of the Holy Roman Empire.

His descendants include Eliyahu ben Moshe Ashkenazi, more known as Eliyahu Baal Shem Elijah Loans, the wife of Rabbi Joseph Hahn, author of the Yosif Ometz, and their grandson Rabbi Joseph Kosman, author of Noheg Katzon Yosef.

A biography of his life, titled ”Rabbi Joselman of Rosheim” was written by Rabbi Dr. Marcus (Meir) Lehmann, a Rabbi and prolific writer in the late 1800s. His book also includes much of R. Joselman's diary. This work has been translated into English twice, the second time abridged.

== Literary activity ==
Josel was influenced by the Jewish apologist and polemicist Abraham Bibago. In his active life, Josel always found time to study Torah, religious literature, and besides his apologetic pamphlets, he wrote several religious and ethical works, which in part are still extant. His most important books are:

- Derek ha-chodesh, written 1531 in Brabant, containing rules for a pious life, especially in cases where a Jew has to bear martyrdom. Two fragments of this work, otherwise lost, are retained in the book Yosif Ometz, by Joseph Hahn, Frankfurt am Main, 1723.
- Sefer ha-Miqnah, finished 1546, the first part of which contains words of admonition against traitors in the midst of Israel, the second part being cabalistic. A manuscript in the Bodleian Library, Oxford (Neubauer, "Catalogue of the Hebrew MSS. in the Bodleian Library" No. 2240), contains the greater part of this work.

Josel's memoirs (printed in the Hebrew original with a French translation in Revue des Études Juives, xvi. 84) contain reports (incomplete) of some important events in his life until 1547, especially some relating to his public activity. They seem to have been written down soon after that year.

== Representation in fictional works ==
Josel was the title character of the 1892 Yiddish operetta Melits Yosher: Rabbi Yoselman, or The Alsatian Decree by Abraham Goldfaden.
