= Vom Schem Hamphoras =

1543 book written by German Reformation leader Martin Luther

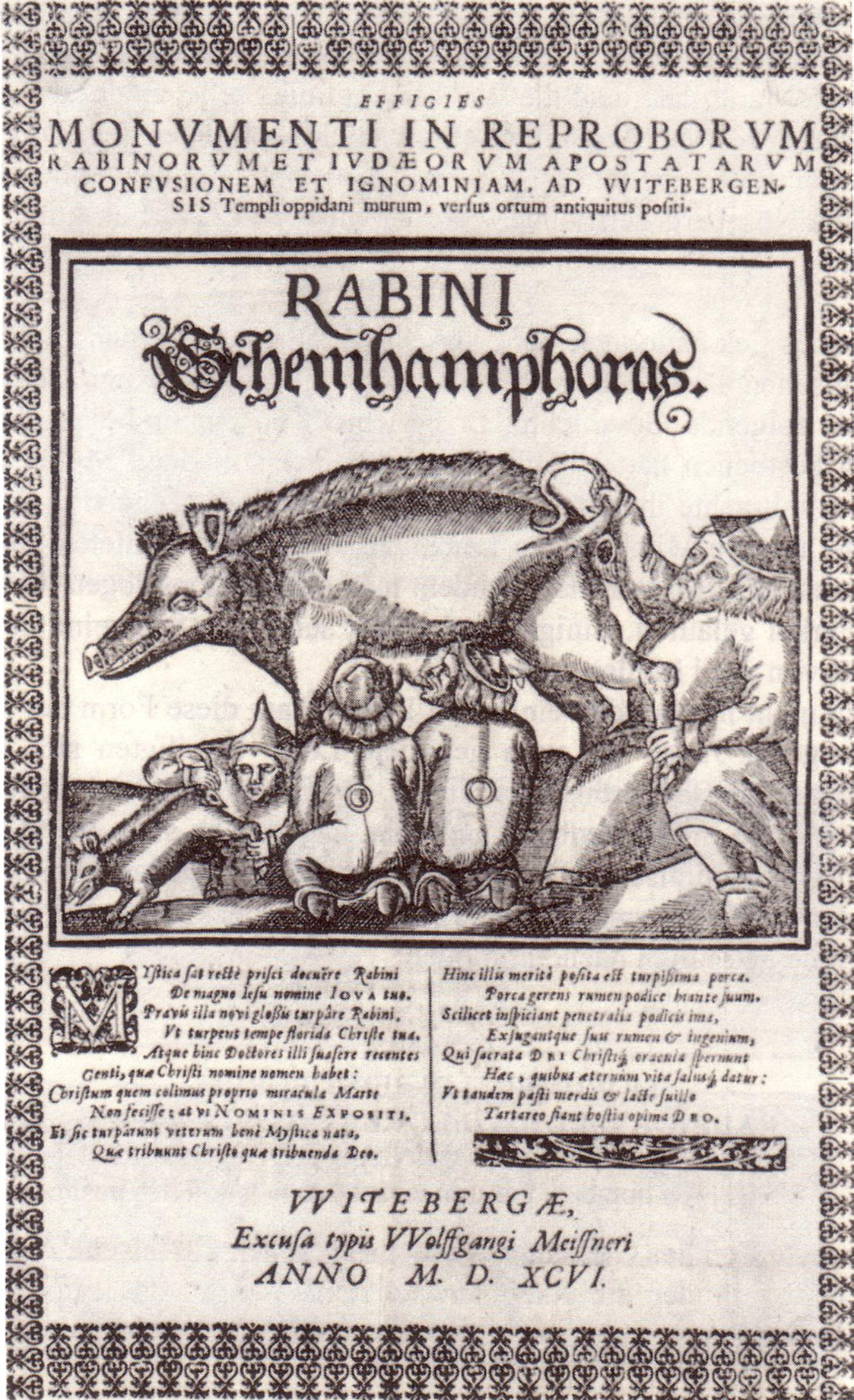
The Judensau from Wittenberg, 1596

Vom Schem Hamphoras, full title: Vom Schem Hamphoras und vom Geschlecht Christi (Of the Unknowable Name and the Generations of Christ), was a book written by German Reformation leader Martin Luther in 1543, in which he equated Jews with the Devil and described them in condemning language.

Schem Hamphoras is the Hebrew rabbinic name for the ineffable name of God, the tetragrammaton. Luther's use of the term was in itself a taunt and insult to Jewish sensitivities. He wrote the 125-page text several months after publishing On the Jews and Their Lies.

In Hamphoras (pp. 34-35) he wrote:

"Here in Wittenberg, in our parish church, there is a sow carved into the stone under which lie young pigs and Jews who are sucking; behind the sow stands a rabbi who is lifting up the right leg of the sow, raises behind the sow, bows down and looks with great effort into the Talmud under the sow, as if he wanted to read and see something most difficult and exceptional; no doubt they gained their Shem Hamphoras from that place..."

Luther argued that the Jews were no longer the chosen people but "the devil's people". An English translation of Vom Schem Hamphoras was first published in 1992 as part of The Jew in Christian Theology by Gerhard Falk. Historians have noted Luther's writings contributed to antisemitism within the German provinces during his era. Historical evidence shows that the Nazi Party in the 1930s and 1940s used Luther's writings to build up antisemitism under their rule, by exerting pressure on schools to incorporate it into the curriculum, and the Lutheran church to incorporate it into sermons. Luther's writings were used extensively by the Nazis.

== See also ==
- Judensau – the image of Jews in obscene contact with a large sow (female pig) which first appeared in the thirteenth century
- Luther and antisemitism
