= Johannes Wallmann =

Johannes Wallmann may refer to:

- H. Johannes Wallmann, German composer
- Johannes Wallmann (theologian), German theologian
