= Martin Luther in Nazi Germany =

Nazi German ideological justification

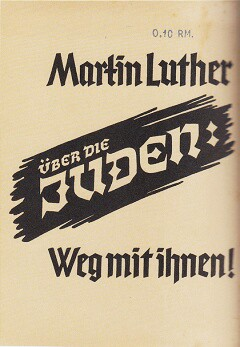
1938 edition of On the Jews and Their Lies: the cover reads "Concerning the Jews: Away With Them!"

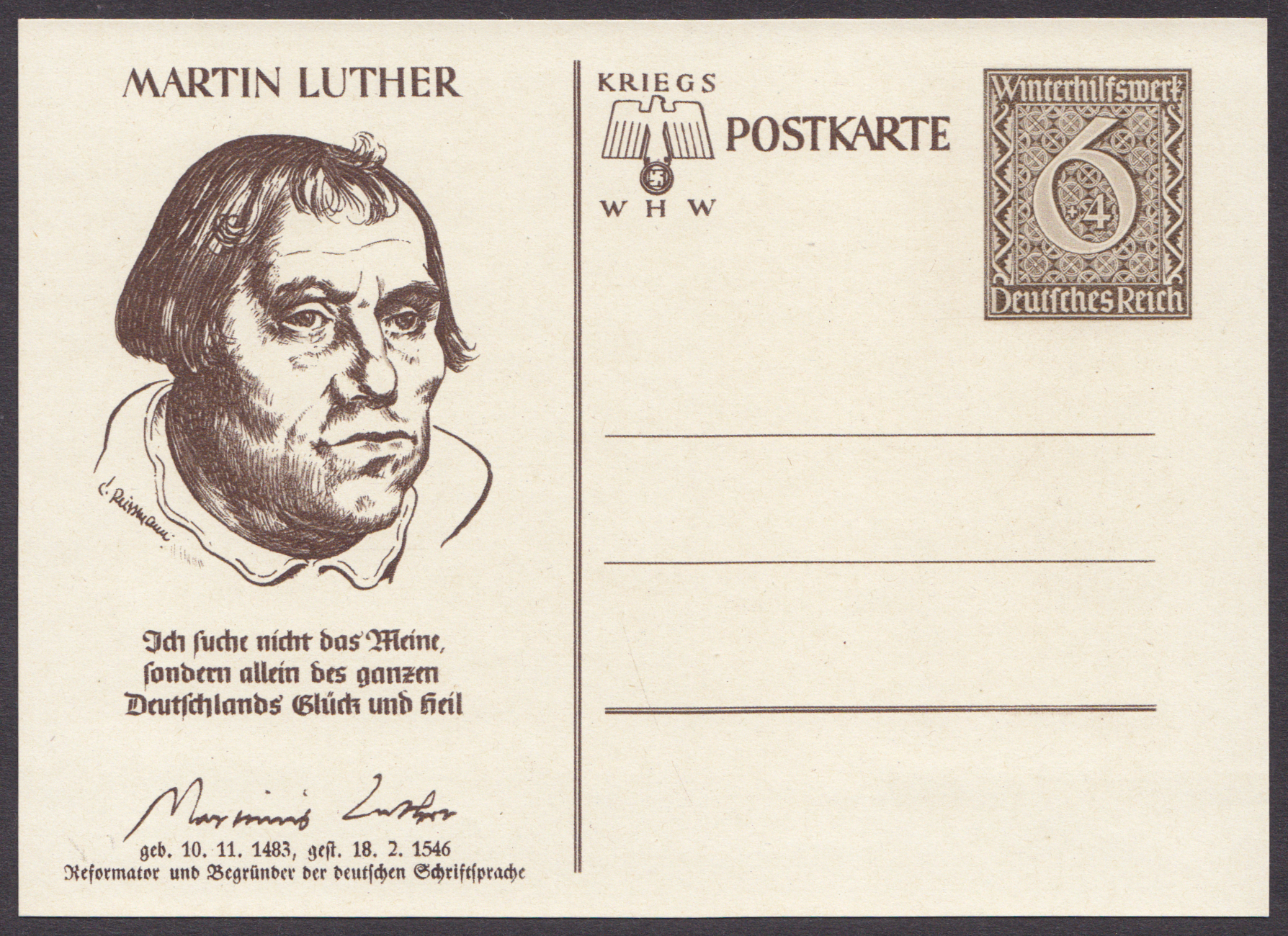
Third Reich postcard of Martin Luther.

The German Reformation theologian Martin Luther was widely lauded in Nazi Germany prior to the Nazi government's dissolution in 1945, with German leadership praising his seminal position in German history while leveraging his antisemitism and folk hero status to further legitimize their own positive Christian religious policies and Germanic ethnonationalism. Luther was seen as both a cross-confessional figurehead and as a symbol of German Protestant support for the Nazi regime in particular, with a religious leader even comparing Führer Adolf Hitler to Luther directly.

A major aspect of this ideological relationship was Martin Luther's birthday on November 10, the 450th anniversary of which was celebrated as a national holiday, the Luthertag, in 1933.

== Influence prior to 1933 election ==
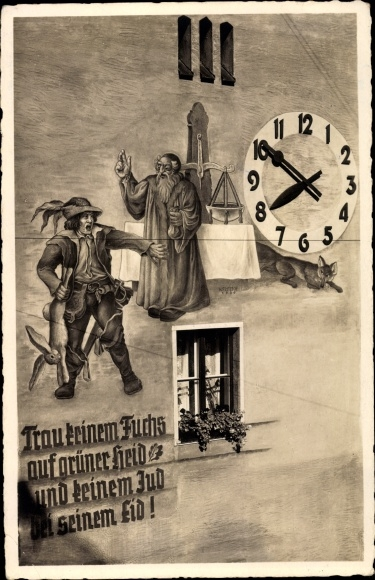
An antisemitic mural featuring a quote from On the Jews and Their Lies published as a postcard for propaganda purposes

A recurring point of contention among scholars of Luther's work is whether or not his antisemitic beliefs could have directly influenced the repression and genocide under the Nazi regime. American historian Lucy Dawidowicz described the line of "anti-semitic descent" from Luther to Hitler as being "easy to draw", writing that both Luther and Hitler were obsessed with the "demonologized universe" which they believed was inhabited by Jews, with Hitler asserting that the later Luther, the author of On the Jews and Their Lies, was the 'real' Luther.

Although many other scholars have contested these connections and the true relationship between Lutheran and Nazi antisemitism yet lacks consensus, historian David H. Lindquist nonetheless summarizes the matter by stating: "It would be disingenuous to hold that the Nazi persecution of the Jews could have occurred without the presence of preexisting conditions in German culture in particular and European society in general, and the existence of long-term, seemingly endemic antisemitism in various forms is the most important of such conditions" and argues the "Racial root" of Nazi antisemitism to be part of the same historical context of the "Religious root" of Luther's writings on Jews.

== Status ==
Martin Luther's role in German history was emphasized as part of the wider doctrine of positive Christianity, which presented itself as a nondenominational scholarly movement expurgating a perceived "Jewish spirit" polluting the Christian Churches of the German nation. Propaganda pieces in Der Stürmer summarized Luther as "one of the greatest anti-Semites in German history.” His anti-Catholic legacy also made him a particularly significant figure among the German Christians and other Protestant groups.

Other appropriations of Martin Luther's image and writings for NSDAP purposes included Trust No Fox on his Green Heath and No Jew on his Oath, an antisemitic children's picture book by kindergarten teacher Elvira Bauer published by Der Stürmer editor Julius Streicher with a title taken directly from Luther's On the Jews and Their Lies.

== Anniversaries ==
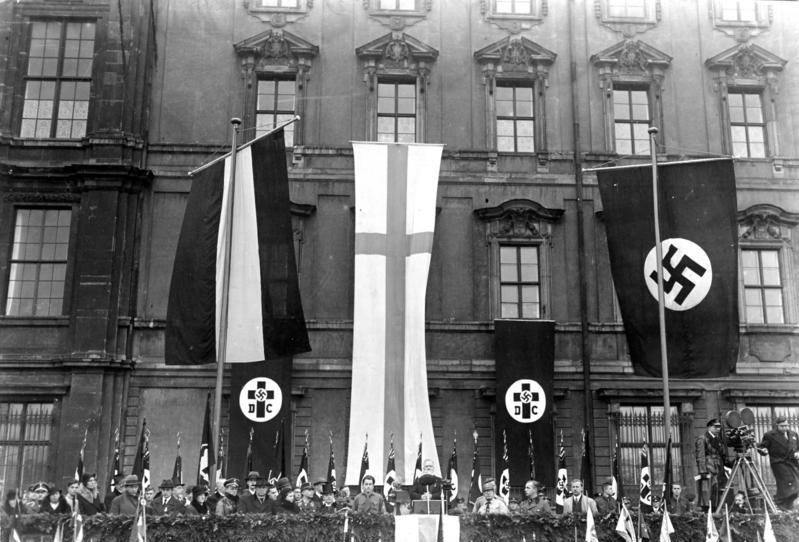
German Christians celebrating German Luther Day in Berlin in 1933, speech by Bishop Hossenfelder

Nazi propaganda repeatedly emphasized the anniversaries of Martin Luther's birthday as times for patriotic celebration. The most notable of these was his 450th birthday in November 1933, which was declared a nationwide holiday termed "German Luther Day" and featured public demonstrations by pro-Nazi Christians and speeches by major religious figures. An article in the Chemnitzer Tageblatt stated that "German Volk are united not only in loyalty and love for the Fatherland, but also once more in the old German beliefs of Luther [Lutherglauben]; a new epoch of strong, conscious religious life has dawned in Germany."

Richard Steigmann-Gall writes in his 2003 book The Holy Reich: Nazi Conceptions of Christianity, 1919–1945:

The leadership of the Protestant League espoused a similar view. Fahrenhorst, who was on the planning committee of the Luthertag, called Luther "the first German spiritual Führer" who spoke to all Germans regardless of clan or confession. [...] Promising that the celebration of Luther's birthday would not turn into a confessional affair, Fahrenhorst invited Hitler to become the official patron of the Luthertag. In subsequent correspondences, Fahrenhorst repeatedly voiced the notion that reverence for Luther could somehow cross confessional boundaries: "Luther is truly not only the founder of a Christian confession; much more, his ideas had a fruitful impact on all Christianity in Germany." Precisely because of Luther's political as well as religious significance, the Luthertag would serve as a confession both "to church and Volk."

Similar events included the 400th anniversary of Luther's German translation of the Bible the following year. Nazi propaganda would later also celebrate the Kristallnacht mass pogroms of 1938 as coinciding with Luther's birthday, on November 9-10.

== Legacy ==
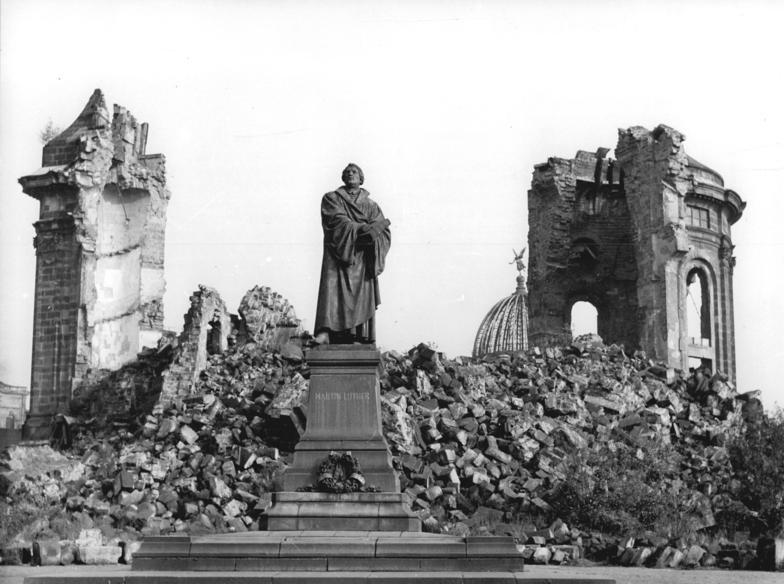
Statue of Luther in the ruins of Dresden in the aftermath of the second World War

Martin Luther's use in Third Reich propaganda has remained a contentious aspect of his image, despite the modern Lutheran confession firmly denouncing his anti-Semitic views and more modern historians attempting to recharacterize Luther as an "incriminated personality" manipulated for propagandistic purposes.

History professor Albert Howard traced the politicization of Martin Luther's legacy to the nineteenth century, when celebrations became polarized between two conflicting interpretations of the theologian: “One is the liberal Luther, whose reforms are seen as leading to progress and the modern age, and the other the nationalist Luther, whose Bible translation helped shape the modern German language and identity.” This nationalist aspect would come to a head with the 1917 Reformation Quadricentennial under the German Empire, paving the way for the Nazis' interpretation of Luther Day.

The Topography of Terror museum in Berlin marked the 500th anniversary of the Reformation with an exhibition of the weaponization of Luther's image under the Third Reich. The exhibition's title, "Luther's Words are Everywhere", was taken from the writings of Dietrich Bonhoeffer, a Lutheran theologian executed for his anti-Nazi views in 1945.

== See also ==
- Religion in Nazi Germany
- Gottgläubig
- Religious views of Adolf Hitler
