= Abraham Bibago =

Sephardic Jewish scholar (c. 1420–1489)

- Born: c. 1420; Zaragoza
- Died: 1489
- Occupation: Philosopher of religion

Abraham ben Shem Tov Bibago (c. 1420–1489) was a Sephardic Jewish philosopher, scholar, rabbi, preacher, theologian, and author from Aragon.

== Biography ==
A Jewish Averroist and Aristotelian who believed in a unification of philosophy, science, and faith, his two best-known works were Derekh Emunah (The Way of Faith), a defense of Judaism, and Commentary on Aristotle’s Metaphysics. He was a leader of the Jewish community in Saragossa, his birthplace, and Huesca, where he moved around 1470, and directed a yeshiva there where philosophy was a key part of the curriculum. He played a role in the intellectual controversies of 15th-century Spain, defended the study of philosophy and its place in Jewish life, and critiqued philosophers who disregarded the importance of faith.

Like Judah Messer Leon, he made use of Christian, Arabic-Hebrew, and Latin sources, and sought to understand Christian theology and philosophy, including methods of proof, criticizing zealotry and what he saw as false beliefs that lacked knowledge. Bibago argued that Talmudic rabbis were knowledgeable in many disciplines, such as Euclidean geometry, mathematics, engineering, and natural science, and that the sciences originated among the Jews; he claimed Aristotle as Jewish and that the Greeks had also learned from that tradition. He was a vigorous defender of Maimonides, particularly against Gersonides, and was influenced by Judah Halevi's particularism and nationalism, influencing the later work of Josel of Rosheim. His work became well known to other 15th and 16th century Jewish philosophers in Spain, Ottoman Empire, Italy, such as Isaac Arama or Solomon ibn Verga, who knew of his court polemics, while Meir ibn Gabbai and Solomon Alkabetz took a more critical view of him and his theological approach.

== Works ==
- Derekh Emunah, written toward the close of his life, and printed in 1521 at Constantinople.
- Eẓ Ḥayyim (Tree of Life) deals with creation, and has for its object the refutation of the arguments advanced by Aristotle, Averroes, and others in favor of the eternity of the world. The author quotes this treatise three times in the Derek Emunah
- Zeh Yenaḥamenu, a homily on Gen. v. 29, published at Salonica in 1522
- Maḥazeh Shaddai, treating of the belief in resurrection.
- A work on sacrifice as means of communion with God.
- A refutation of the objections raised by Naḥmanides against Maimonides.
- Ma'amar 'al Ribbui ha-Ẓurot a treatise on "The Plurality of Forms, Particularly in Man"—Paris manuscript 1004, though without his name.
- Two philosophical letters to Moses Arondi.
- A compendium of therapeutics after Galen; besides a number of philosophical works in the form of commentaries to Averroes.
- Demonstration, A commentary on Averroes' work on logic, written at Huesca in 1446, exists in manuscript, Vatican and Paris. In this work Bibago defends Averroes against Gersonides.
- A commentary on Averroes' Physics,
- a commentary on Aristotle's Metaphysics—still extant in manuscript at Munich.

== Jewish Encyclopedia bibliography ==
- Steinschneider, in Monthly, 1883, pp. 79–96, 125–144;
- idem, Heb. Ubers. 1893, pp. 89 et seq., 168 et seq.;
- Michael, Heimann Joseph (1891). Or ha-Ḥayyim. Frankfort-on-the-Main. No. 255;
- Munk, Philosophy and Philosophical Writers of the Jews (German transl. by Beer), 1852, pp. 36, 83, 117;
- Grätz, History of the Jews, viii. 219–227.
