= Jacob ben Jehiel Loans =

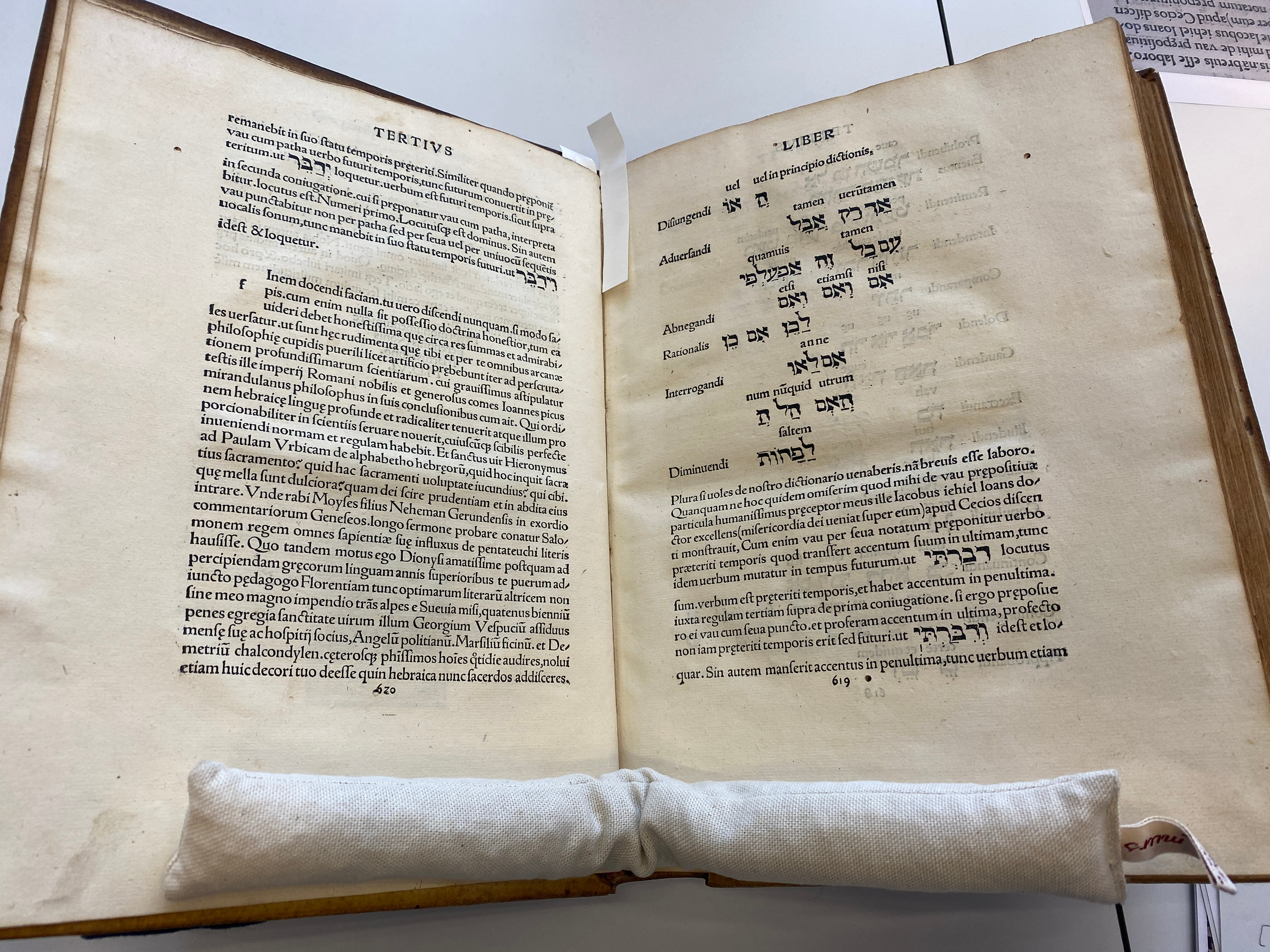
Reuchlin, 1506, tribute to Loans

Jacob ben Jehiel Loans (Yacov of Linz, Jakob von Linz, Yaakov ben Yechiel Loans; died 1506) was an Italian-Jewish rabbi, Court Jew and personal physician to Frederick III, Holy Roman Emperor (1440-93), and who was the first Hebrew teacher to Johann Reuchlin. Loans had served for at least 7 years before he met Reuchlin, and was his teacher for nearly a year. They met in 1492. Reuchlin wrote a letter to Loans in Hebrew in 1500 that he later published, which triggered attacks from Johann Pfefferkorn, an anti-Judaic Jewish-to-Christian convert. Loans knew Reuchlin was looking to acquire a Hebrew Bible codex, and Loans arranged for the Emperor to give one to Reuchlin. He was raised to the nobility in 1465. He is also said to have been the physician to Frederick's son and successor, Maximilian I.

== Jewish Encyclopedia bibliography ==
- Ludwig Geiger, Johann Reuchlin, pp. 105 et seq.;
- Grätz, Gesch. ix. 47, 83, 147;
- Gross, Gallia Judaica, p. 273;
- Steinschneider, Jewish Literature, p. 208;
- Winter and Wünsche, Die Jüdische Litteratur, ii. 225.
