= Lutheran Quarterly =

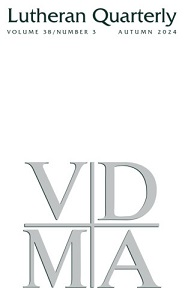
- Discipline: Theology
- Language: English

Publication details
- History: 1987–present
- Frequency: Quarterly

Standard abbreviations
- ISO 4: Lutheran Q.

Indexing
- ISSN: 0024-7499

Links
- Journal homepage

Lutheran Quarterly is a peer-reviewed academic journal covering Lutheran history and theology. It was established in 1987, but styles itself as continuing the tradition of the journal of the same name that was published from 1949 to 1977. It is published by Johns Hopkins University Press on behalf of Lutheran Quarterly, Inc.

It is abstracted and indexed in the ATLA Religion Database, RILM Abstracts of Music Literature, and New Testament Abstracts.

The journal cover bears the letters "VDMA", which stands for "Verbum Domini Manet in Aeternum" ("the Word of the Lord endures forever"), a motto of the Lutheran Reformation.
