= Martin Brecht =

German academic (1932–2021)

Martin Brecht (6 March 1932 – 23 July 2021) was a German Church historian who was professor emeritus of the University of Münster, Westphalia. Until his retirement in 1997 at age 65, he served as head of the Department of Medieval and Modern Church History of the Evangelical Theological Faculty of the university.

Brecht was author of a three volume comprehensive biography of Martin Luther, published in German, 1981–1987 and of many publications on German pietism. M. Eugene Osterhaven of Western Theological Seminary in Holland, Michigan said, about Brecht's contribution to theological studies, "Martin Brecht has an established reputation, and his thorough work on Luther is definitive, even though it lacks the crisp literary style of the monographs on Luther of Roland Bainton or Heiko Oberman."

Brecht died on 23 July 2021, at the age of 89.
