= Uwe Siemon-Netto =

German religion editor (1936–2025)

- Born: October 25, 1936; Leipzig, Gau Saxony, Germany
- Died: August 29, 2025 (aged 88)
- Occupations: Journalist, author
- Years active: 1956–2005
- Spouses: Gillian née Ackers (married c. 1962–2022); Karin von Renthe-Fink (married 2023)

Uwe Siemon-Netto (25 October 1936 – 29 August 2025) was a German religion editor of United Press International, international columnist and Lutheran lay theologian. He was a Senior Distinguished Fellow of 1517 (1517.org), a non-profit initiative built, in part, upon the work of Martin Luther, John Warwick Montgomery, and Rod Rosenbladt. This initiative absorbed the Center for Lutheran Theology and Public Life (CLTPL) and The League of Faithful Masks (LFM), a non-profit religious corporation based in Capistrano Beach, California. Siemon-Netto founded CLTPL-LFM and was its director emeritus. CLTPL/LFM champions the Lutheran doctrine of vocation as "an antidote against the destructive force of contemporary narcissism". This doctrine holds that Christians have a divine calling to serve their neighbor in all their secular endeavors. CLTPL was formerly located at Concordia Seminary in St. Louis, Missouri, where Siemon-Netto served as scholar-in-residence until 2009. As a journalist, Siemon-Netto specialized in issues relating to faith and society, and in foreign affairs. He was a correspondent of freepressers.com, an internet publication, and was a contributor of The Atlantic Times, an English-language monthly newspaper produced by leading German journalists for the North American market. He also taught as a visiting professor of journalism at Concordia University Irvine and led doctoral-level seminars at Concordia Seminary and other venues in the United States, Germany, and France.

== Background ==
Siemon-Netto was born in Leipzig, Gau Saxony, Germany, where his devoutly Lutheran grandmother was the pivotal figure in his childhood in World War II.

He attended a variety of schools in Germany. He earned his M.A. in theology at the Lutheran School of Theology in Chicago. His Ph.D. in theology and sociology of religion is from Boston University under Peter L. Berger, Carter Lindberg, and Uri Ra'Anan. He spent a post-doctoral year at the Center of Theological Inquiry in Princeton, New Jersey, working on a project to bridge the gap between theology and the media.

For nearly 60 years, Siemon-Netto was married to Gillian née Ackers, an Englishwoman, who died in Mission Viejo, California, on 6 March 2022.

On 15 April 2023, he married Karin von Renthe-Fink, a fellow German he met at church after his first wife's death.

Siemon-Netto died on 29 August 2025, at the age of 88.

== Journalism career ==
Siemon-Netto began his journalism career 1956 as a trainee at Westfalenpost, a large regional newspaper in southern Westphalia. In 1958, he joined the Associated Press in Frankfurt first as copy editor, then as slot editor and roving reporter, covering, among other things, the construction of the Berlin Wall in 1961. From 1962 to 1969, he worked as a correspondent for Springer Foreign News Service in London, Paris, New York, Vietnam, the Middle East, and Hong Kong. His assignments included the United Nations, the U.S. civil rights movement, the assassination of President John F. Kennedy, the Vietnam War (over a period of five years), the Arab–Israeli Six-Day War, and China's Cultural Revolution. From 1969 to 1973, Siemon-Netto was North American correspondent for the magazine, Der Stern, writing about many major news events in North, Central, and South America, and in East Asia, France, and again Vietnam.

From 1973 to 1986, Siemon-Netto served as managing editor for Hamburger Morgenpost, taught journalism at Hamburg's Henri-Nannen-Schule, worked as a freelance correspondent for German, Swiss, French, and U.S. publications, and as a media consultant overseeing a variety of design and management tasks at publications in Germany and the United States.

In mid-career, at age 50, he began his theological studies, first in Chicago, then in Boston. During these studies, Siemon-Netto freelanced as a magazine correspondent. At the time of the collapse of the Berlin Wall in 1989 and Germany's subsequent reunification, he served, concurrently with his academic work, as an editorial consultant and—as independent contractor—executive editor for Bild, launching its East German editions, helping plan newspapers for Leipzig and Dresden, training Eastern German journalists, and developing a new curriculum for Journalistenschule Axel Springer.

From 1993 to 1994 he managed the redesign of the Berlin daily paper Der Tagesspiegel, the Scientific American in New York, and ideaSpektrum, a Protestant magazine in Wetzlar, Germany. He also co-founded CA – Confessio Augustana, a Lutheran quarterly magazine in Neuendettelsau, Bavaria. From 2000 to 2005, he was religious affairs editor of United Press International and a Washington-based columnist for a variety of German-language publications.

== Honors and awards ==
- D.Litt., Concordia Seminary, St. Louis, Mo. (2004)
- Friedrich Hecker Freedom Award (2009)

== Bibliography ==
=== Books ===
- Siemon-Netto, Uwe (1990). The Acquittal of God: a theology for Vietnam veterans. New York: Pilgrim Press. ISBN 0-8298-0833-7.
- The Fabricated Luther: the rise and fall of the Shirer myth. St. Louis: Concordia Publishing House, 1995; ISBN 0-570-04800-1.
- Luther als Wegbereiter Hitlers? Zur Geschichte eines Vorurteils. Gütersloh: Gütersloher Verlagshaus, 1993; ISBN 3-579-02203-2.
- One incarnate truth: Christianity's answer to spiritual chaos. Concordia Publishing House, 2002; ISBN 0758602774.
- Đức: A reporter's love for the wounded people of Vietnam. Amazon, 2013; ISBN 978-1482692808 and ISBN 1482692805.
- On the brink: the myth of German anti-Americanism. Washington, D.C.: Ethics and Public Policy Center, 1982; ISBN 0-89633-056-7.
- Đức, der Deutsche. Mein Vietnam, Warum die Falschen siegten. Basel: Brunnen-Verlag. 2014; ISBN 978-3-7655-2024-2.
- Triumph of the Absurd: A Reporter's Love for the Abandoned People of Vietnam (Đức 3rd edition). Irvine: NRP Books, 2015; ISBN 978-1-94550-000-8
- Griewatsch. Der Lümmel aus dem Leipziger Luftschutzkeller. Basel: fontis, 2015; ISBN 978-3-03848-038-9.
- Luther. Lehrmeister des Widerstandes, Basel: fontis, 2016. ISBN 978-3-03848-092-1.
- Luther manipulé. Contre le mythe du réformateur, "fourrier de Hitler". Paris: Indes Savantes, 2017; ISBN 978-2-84654-456-6
- Urchin at War: The tale of a Leipzig rascal and his Lutheran granny under bombs in Nazi Germany. Irvine: 1517 Publishing, 2021; ISBN 978-1-94896-958-1
- Urchin on the Beat: The Tale of a Bad Adolescence and Its Joyful Conclusion. Irvine: 1517 Publishing, 2024; ISBN 978-1-96265-464-7

=== Essays and reporting ===
- "Bewitched By Bolivar." Civilization 7 (April/May 2000) No. 2:78–86.
- "I Was an East German, Elian Gonzalez." The Wall Street Journal – Eastern Edition 235 04/06/2000) No. 69:A22.
- "J.S. Bach in Japan." First Things: A Monthly Journal of Religion & Public Life (June/July 2000) No. 104:15–17.
- "Luther and Hitler: Friends or Foes?" 35 Dialog: a Journal of Theology (Summer 1996):188–192.
- "Luther and the Jews." The Lutheran Witness 123 (2004) No. 4:16–19.
- "Luther versus Lenin." Lutheran Quarterly ns 5 (Winter 1991):403–417.
- "The Next Pope." The National Interest (Winter 2003/2004) No. 74:109-114.
- "Sonderweg." The National Interest (Winter 2002/2003) No. 70:33–44.
- Siemon-Netto, Uwe (January–February 2016). "Where Muslim dreams may lead". Quadrant. 60 (1–2): 38–41.
