= Johann Reuchlin =

German humanist and scholar (1455–1522)

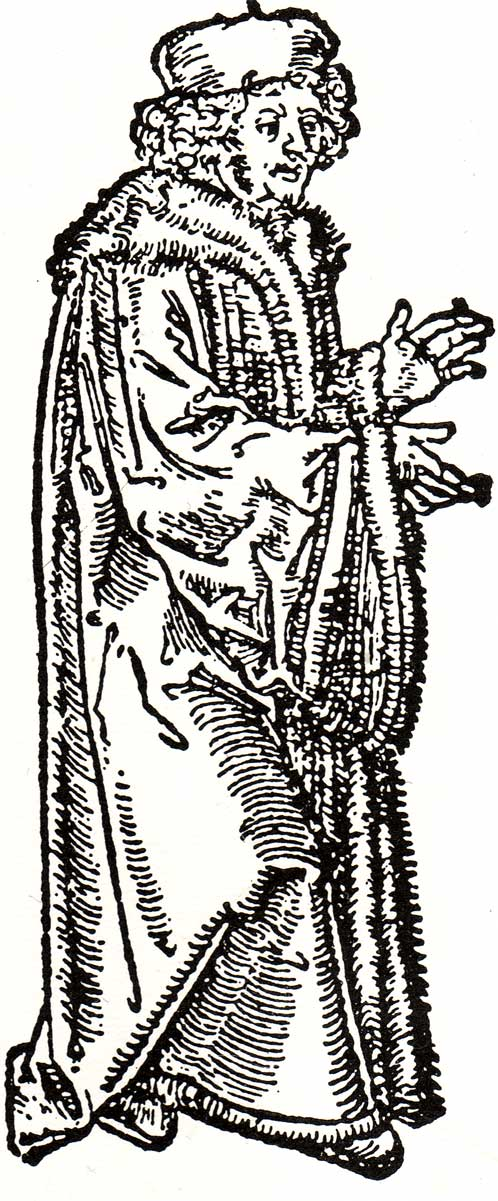
- Johann Reuchlin, woodcut depiction from 1516
- Born: 29 January 1455; Pforzheim, Margraviate of Baden
- Died: 30 June 1522 (aged 67); Stuttgart, Duchy of Württemberg
- Other name: Johannes von Reuchlin

Education
- Education: University of Basel; College of Sorbonne; University of Freiburg; University of Orléans; University of Poitiers
- Academic advisors: Jakob ben Jehiel Loans; Obadja Sforno

Philosophical work
- Era: Renaissance philosophy
- Region: Western philosophy
- School: Renaissance humanism
- Institutions: University of Ingolstadt
- Main interests: Ancient Greek, Hebrew, law, Christian mysticism
- Notable ideas: Christian Kabbalah; Reuchlinian pronunciation

Johann Reuchlin (/ˈrɔɪxlin/; German: [ˈjoːhan ˈʁɔʏçlɪn]; 29 January 1455 – 30 June 1522), sometimes called Johannes, was a German Catholic humanist and a scholar of Greek and Hebrew, whose work also took him to modern-day Austria, Switzerland, Italy, and France. Most of Reuchlin's career centered on advancing German knowledge of Greek and Hebrew.

== Early life ==
Johann Reuchlin was born at Pforzheim in the Black Forest in 1455, where his father was an administrative officer of the Dominican monastery. According to the fashion of the time, his name was graecized by his Italian friends into Capnion (Καπνίων), a nickname which Reuchlin used as a sort of transparent mask when he introduced himself as an interlocutor in the De Verbo Mirifico. He remained fond of his home town; he constantly calls himself Phorcensis, and in the De Verbo he ascribes to Pforzheim his inclination towards literature.

Here he began his Latin studies in the monastery school, and, though in 1470 he was for a short time at Freiburg, that university seems to have taught him little. Reuchlin's career as a scholar appears to have turned almost on an accident; his fine voice gained him a place in the household of Charles I, Margrave of Baden, and soon, having some reputation as a Latinist, he was chosen to accompany Frederick, the third son of the prince, to the University of Paris.

Frederick was some years his junior, and was destined for an ecclesiastical career. This new connection did not last long, but it determined the course of Reuchlin's life. He now began to learn Greek, which had been taught in the French capital since 1470, and he also attached himself to the leader of the Paris realists, Jean à Lapide (d. 1496), a worthy and learned man, whom he followed to the vigorous young University of Basel in 1474.

== Teaching and writing career ==
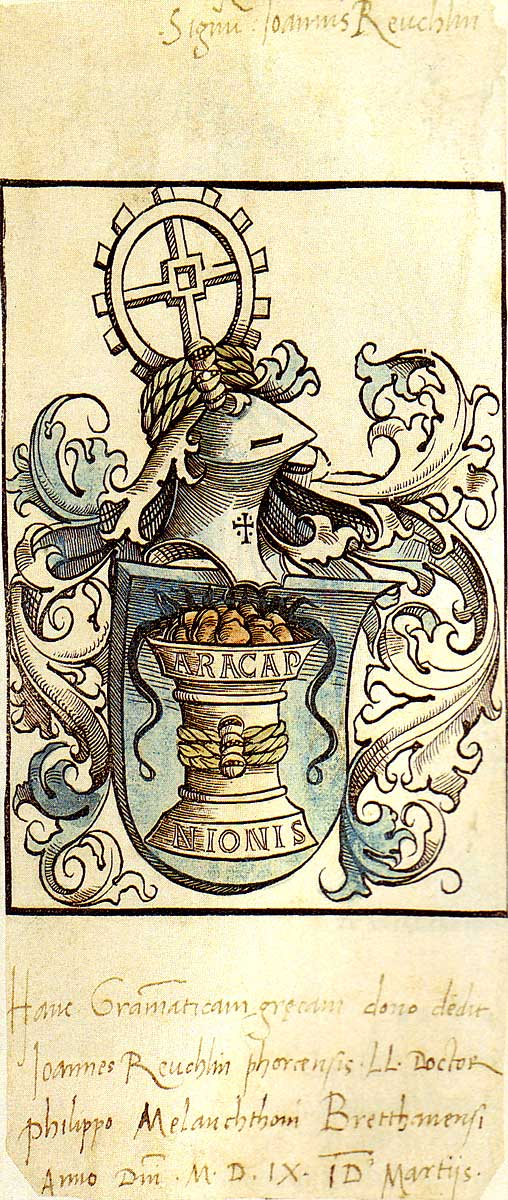
Johann Reuchlin's coat of arms

At Basel, Reuchlin took his master's degree in 1477 and began to lecture, teaching a more classical Latin than was then common in German schools, and explaining Aristotle in Greek. He continued his Greek studies at Basel under Andronicus Contoblacas. In Basel he made the acquaintance of the bookseller Johann Amerbach, for whom he prepared a Latin lexicon (Vocabularius Breviloquus, 1st edition, 1475–76), which ran through many editions. This first publication, and Reuchlin's account of his teaching at Basel in a letter to Cardinal Adrian (Adriano Castellesi) in February 1518, show that he had already found his life's work. He was a born teacher, and this work was not to be done mainly from the professor's chair.

By 1477, Reuchlin had left Basel to seek further Greek training with George Hermonymus in Paris, and to learn to write a fair Greek hand that he might support himself by copying manuscripts. And now he felt that he must choose a profession. His choice fell on law, and he was thus led to the great school of Orléans (1478), and finally to Poitiers, where he became licentiate in July 1481.

From Poitiers, Reuchlin went in December 1481 to Tübingen with the intention of becoming a teacher in the local university, but his friends recommended him to Count Eberhard of Württemberg, who was about to travel to Italy and required an interpreter. Reuchlin was selected for this post, and in February 1482 left Stuttgart for Florence and Rome. The journey lasted but a few months, but it brought the German scholar into contact with several learned Italians, especially at the Medicean Academy in Florence; his connection with the count became permanent, and after his return to Stuttgart he received important posts at Eberhard's court. About this time, he appears to have married, but little is known of his married life. He left no children, but in later years, his sister's grandson Philipp Melanchthon was like a son to him until the Reformation estranged them.

In 1490, he was again in Italy. Here he saw Pico della Mirandola, to whose Kabbalistic doctrines he afterward became heir, and made a friend of the pope's secretary, Jakob Questenberg, which was of service to him in his later troubles. Again in 1492 he was employed on an embassy to the emperor Frederick at Linz, and here he began to read Hebrew with the emperor's Jewish physician Jakob ben Jehiel Loans, whose instruction laid the basis of that thorough knowledge which Reuchlin afterward improved on his third visit to Rome in 1498 by the instruction of Obadja Sforno of Cesena. In 1494, his rising reputation was greatly enhanced by the publication of De Verbo Mirifico.

In 1496, Duke Eberhard I of Württemberg died, and enemies of Reuchlin had the ear of his successor, Duke Heinrich of Württemberg (formerly Heinrich Count of Württemberg-Mömpelgard). He was glad, therefore, hastily to follow the invitation of Johann von Dalberg (1445–1503), the scholarly bishop of Worms, and flee to Heidelberg, which was then the seat of the Rhenish Society. In this court of letters Reuchlin's appointed function was to make translations from the Greek authors, in which his reading was already extremely wide. Though Reuchlin had no public office as a teacher, he was for much of his life the real centre of all Greek and Hebrew teaching in Germany. To carry out this work he provided a series of aids for beginners and others. He never published a Greek grammar, but he had one in manuscript for use with his pupils, and also published several little elementary Greek books. Reuchlin, it may be noted, pronounced Greek as his native teachers had taught him to do, i.e., in the modern Greek fashion. This pronunciation, which he defends in De recta Latini Graecique sermonis pronuntiatione (1528), came to be known, in contrast to that used by Desiderius Erasmus, as the Reuchlinian.

At Heidelberg, Reuchlin had many private pupils, among whom Franz von Sickingen is the best-known name. With the monks he had never been liked; at Stuttgart, his great adversary was the Augustinian Conrad Holzinger. On this man he took a scholar's revenge in his first Latin comedy Sergius, a satire on worthless monks and false relics. Through Dalberg, Reuchlin came into contact with Philip, Count Palatine of the Rhine, who employed him to direct the studies of his sons, and in 1498 gave him the mission to Rome, which has been already noticed as fruitful for Reuchlin's progress in Hebrew. He came back laden with Hebrew books and found when he reached Heidelberg that a change of government had opened the way for his return to Stuttgart, where his wife had remained all along. His friends had now again the upper hand and knew Reuchlin's value. In 1500, or perhaps in 1502, he was given a very high judicial office in the Swabian League, which he held until 1512, when he retired to a small estate near Stuttgart.

== Hebrew studies and advocacy ==
For many years Reuchlin had been increasingly absorbed in Hebrew studies, which had for him more than a mere philological interest. He was interested in the reform of preaching as shown in his De Arte Predicandi (1503) — a book that became a sort of preacher's manual — but above all, as a scholar, he was eager that the Bible should be better known, and could not tie himself to the authority of the Vulgate.

The key to the Hebraea veritas was the grammatical and exegetical tradition of the medieval rabbis, especially of David Kimhi, and when he mastered this, he was resolved to open it to others. In 1506, appeared his epoch-making De Rudimentis Hebraicis — grammar and lexicon — mainly after Kimhi, yet not a mere copy of one man's teaching. The edition was costly and sold slowly. One great difficulty was that wars in Italy prevented Hebrew Bibles from coming into Germany. But for this also Reuchlin found help by printing the Penitential Psalms with grammatical explanations (1512), and other helps followed from time to time. But his Greek studies had interested him in those fantastical and mystical systems of later times with which the Kabbala has no small affinity. Following Pico, he seemed to find in the Kabbala a profound theosophy that might be of the greatest service for the defence of Christianity and the reconciliation of science with the mysteries of faith, a common notion at that time. Reuchlin's mystico-cabalistic ideas and objects were expounded in the De Verbo Mirifico, and finally in the De Arte Cabalistica (1517).

Many of his contemporaries thought that the first step to the conversion of the Jews was to take away their books. This view was advocated by Johannes Pfefferkorn, a German theologian. Pfefferkorn, himself a convert from Judaism, actively preached against the Jews and attempted to destroy copies of the Talmud, and engaged in what became a long-running pamphleteering battle with Reuchlin. He wrote that "The causes which hinder the Jews from becoming Christians are three: first, usury; second, because they are not compelled to attend Christian churches to hear the sermons; and third because they honor the Talmud." Pfefferkorn's plans were backed by the Dominicans of Cologne; and in 1509 he obtained a mandate by Emperor Maximilian to confiscate all Jewish books directed against the Christian faith. Armed with this mandate, he visited Stuttgart and asked Reuchlin's help as a jurist and expert in putting it into execution. Reuchlin evaded the demand, mainly because the mandate lacked certain formalities, but he could no longer remain neutral. The execution of Pfefferkorn's schemes led to difficulties and to a new appeal to Maximilian.

In 1510, Reuchlin was appointed by Emperor Maximilian to a commission that was convened to review the matter. His answer is dated from Stuttgart, 6 October 1510; in it, he divides the books into six classes — apart from the Bible which no one proposed to destroy — and, going through each class, he shows that the books openly insulting to Christianity are very few and viewed as worthless by most Jews themselves, while the others are either works necessary to the Jewish worship, which was licensed by papal as well as imperial law or contain matter of value and scholarly interest which ought not to be sacrificed because they are connected with another faith than that of the Christians. He proposed that the emperor should decree that for ten years there should be two Hebrew chairs at every German university, for which the Jews should furnish books. Maximilian's other experts proposed that all books should be taken from the Jews; and, as the emperor still hesitated, his opponents threw on Reuchlin the whole blame of their ill success. Pfefferkorn circulated at the Frankfurt Fair of 1511 a gross libel (Handspiegel wider und gegen die Juden) declaring that Reuchlin had been bribed. Reuchlin defended himself in a pamphlet titled Augenspiegel (1511), which the theologians at the University of Cologne attempted to suppress. On 7 October 1512, they, along with the inquisitor Jacob van Hoogstraaten, obtained an imperial order confiscating the Augenspiegel.

In 1513, Reuchlin was summoned before a court of the inquisition. He was willing to receive corrections in theology, which was not his subject, but he could not unsay what he had said; and as his enemies tried to press him into a corner, he met them with open defiance in a Defensio contra Calumniatores (1513). The universities were now appealed to for opinions and were all against Reuchlin. Even Paris (August 1514) condemned the Augenspiegel, and called on Reuchlin to recant. Meantime a formal process had begun at Mainz before the grand inquisitor. But Reuchlin managed to have the jurisdiction changed to the episcopal court of Speyer. The Reuchlin affair caused a wide rift in the church and eventually the case came before the papal court in Rome. Judgment was not finally given until July 1516; and then, though the decision was really for Reuchlin, the trial was simply quashed. And while the Reuchlin's opponents escaped easily at Rome, with only a half condemnation, they received a crushing blow in Germany. In Reuchlin's defense, Virorum Epistolæ Clarorum ad Reuchlinum Phorcensem (Letters of famous men to Reuchlin of Pforzheim), had been published. It was closely followed by Epistolæ Obscurorum Virorum (Letters of Obscure Men).

Ulrich von Hutten and Franz von Sickingen did all they could to force Reuchlin's enemies to restitution of his material damages; they even threatened a feud against the Dominicans of Cologne and Spires. In 1520, a commission met in Frankfurt to investigate the case. It condemned Hoogstraaten. But the final decision of Rome did not indemnify Reuchlin. The contest ended, however; public interest had grown cold, absorbed entirely by the Lutheran question, and Reuchlin had no reason to fear new attacks. When, in 1517, he received the theses propounded by Luther, he exclaimed, "Thanks be to God, at last, they have found a man who will give them so much to do that they will be compelled to let my old age end in peace."

Heinrich Graetz and Francis Yates contended that this affair helped spark the Protestant Reformation. Although suspected of a leaning toward Protestantism, Reuchlin never left the Catholic Church. In 1518, he was appointed professor of Hebrew and Greek at Wittenberg, but instead sent his nephew Melanchthon.

=== Influence on Luther ===
Luther's comment that justification by faith was the "true Cabala" in his Commentary on Galatians has been explained as relating to Reuchlin's influence. While Luther had consulted Reuchlin as a Hebrew expert and used De Arte Cabalistica as support for an argument, Luther took objection to Reuchlin's comment in De rudimentis hebraicis that the Hebrew letters for Jesus' name meant "the hidden God," which Luther found contrary to Matthew, Chapter 1:21, which describes the meaning as being about "he would save His people from their sins."

=== Final years ===
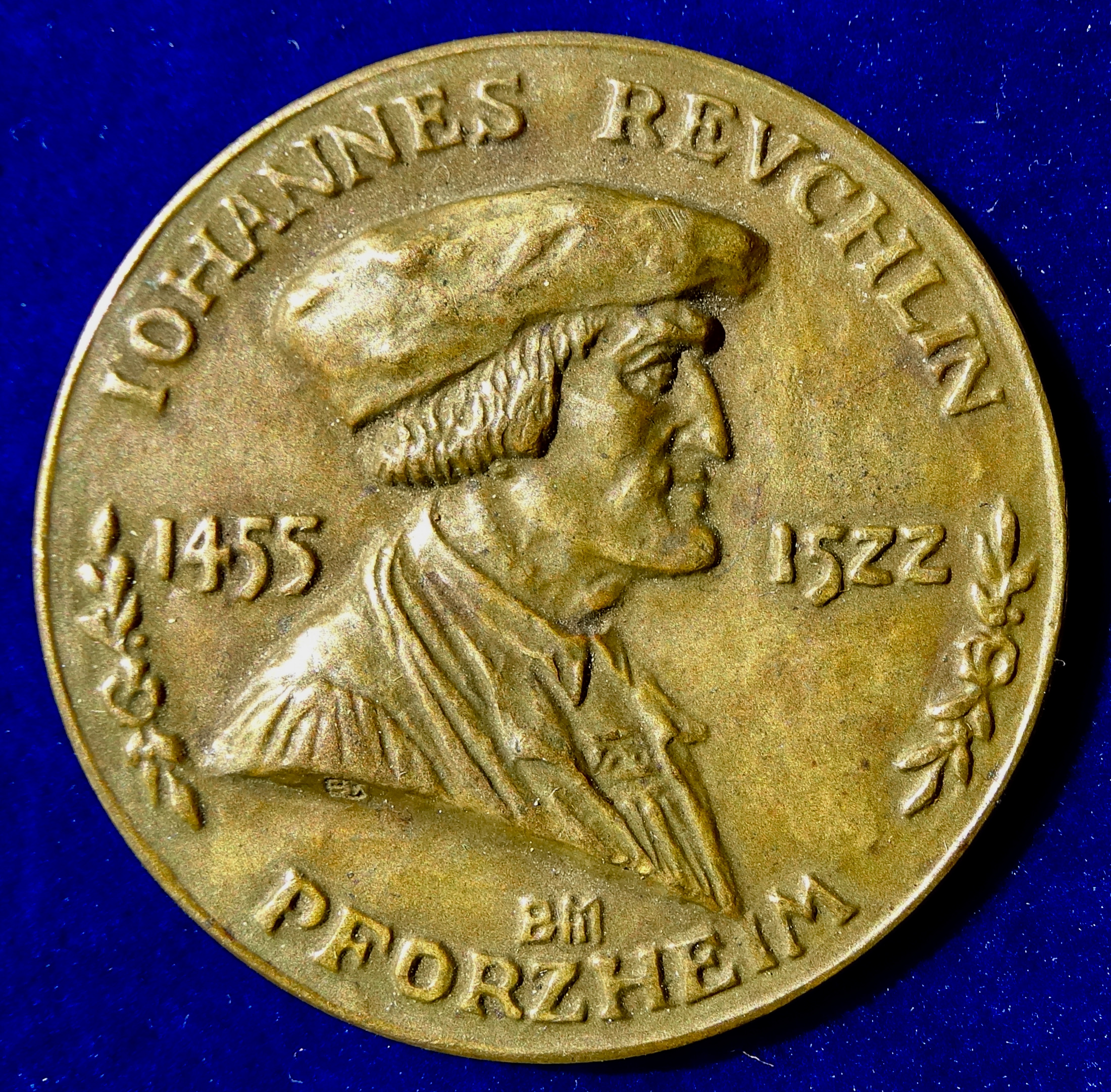
Johannes Reuchlin 400th anniversary of his death 1922 medal

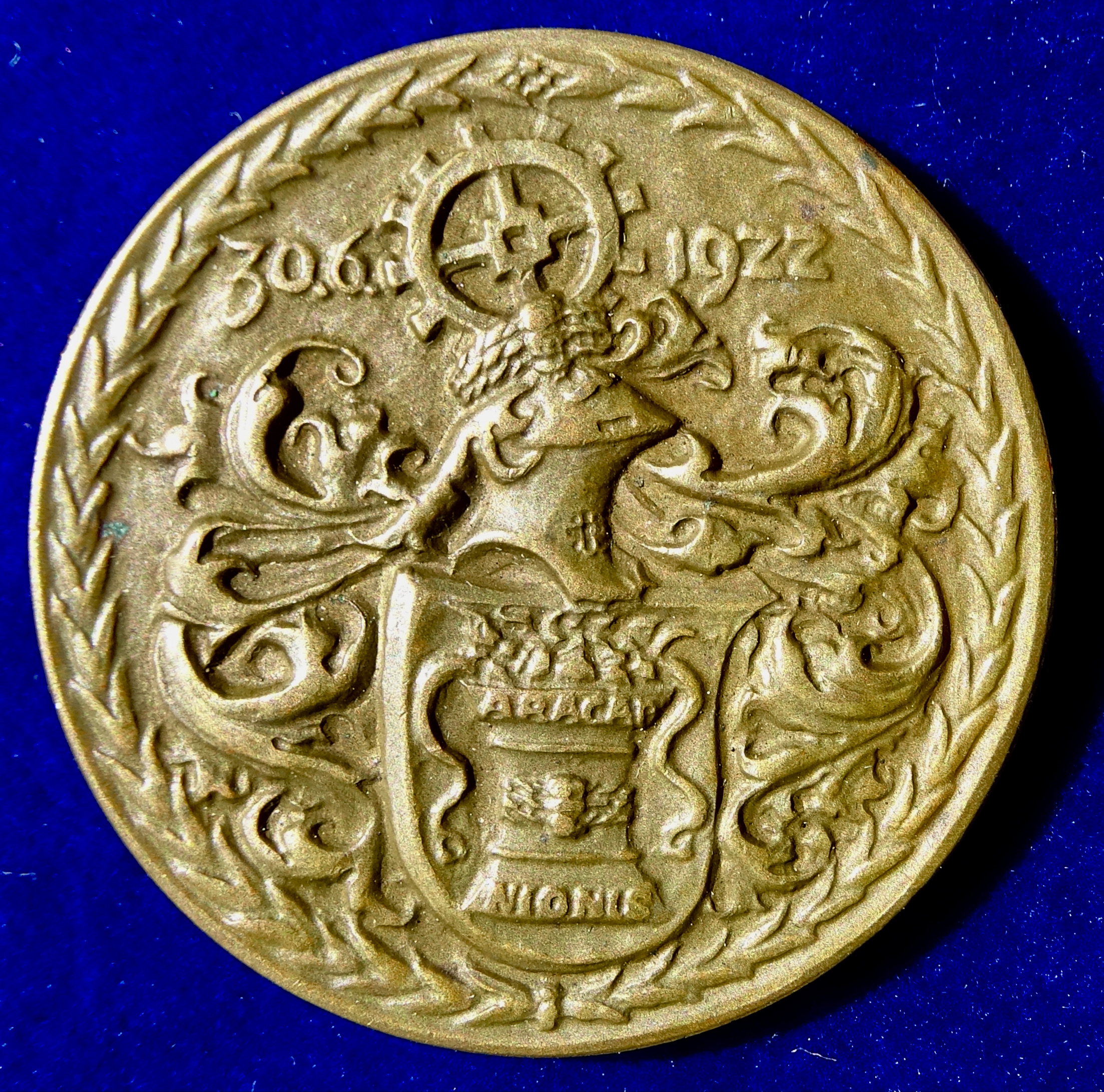
The reverse of this medal by Ernst Barlach

Reuchlin did not long enjoy his victory over his accusers in peace. In 1519, Stuttgart was visited by famine, civil war and pestilence. In response to concerns about growing religious controversies Leo X had Reuchlin's Augenspiegel condemned on 23 June 1520, claiming it to be "scandalous and offensive" and upholding the University of Cologne's previous condemnation.

From November 1519 to the spring of 1521, the veteran statesman sought refuge in the University of Ingolstadt where he received an appointment as professor from William of Bavaria. He taught Greek and Hebrew there for a year. It was 41 years since at Poitiers he had last spoken from a public chair; but at 65 he retained his gift of teaching, and hundreds of scholars crowded round him. This gleam of autumn sunshine was again broken by the plague; but now he was called to Tübingen and again spent the winter of 1521–22 teaching in his own systematic way. But in the spring he found it necessary to visit the baths of Liebenzell, and there contracted jaundice, of which he died, leaving in the history of the new learning a name only second to that of his younger contemporary Erasmus.

Reuchlin died in Stuttgart and is buried at the Church of St Leonhard.

== Works ==
- De Verbo Mirifico (The Wonder-Working Word, 1494)
- De Arte Cabalistica (On the Art of Kabbalah, 1517)
