= Johannes Wallmann (theologian) =

German theologian (1930–2021)

- Born: 21 May 1930; Erfurt, Thuringia, Germany
- Died: 2 January 2021 (aged 90); Berlin, Germany
- Occupations: Protestant theologian and emeritus professor of church history
- Spouse(s): Ingeborg Posselt, Dorothea Wendebourg
- Website: http://www.wallmann.de/person2.html

Johannes Wallmann (21 May 1930 – 2 January 2021) was a German Protestant theologian and emeritus professor of church history at the Ruhr-Universität Bochum.

He died from COVID-19 in Berlin during the COVID-19 pandemic in Germany.

== Career ==
After studying philosophy and theology in Berlin and Tübingen, Wallmann graduated in 1961, received his doctorate in 1968 and in 1971 was made associate professor in church history at the Evangelisch-Theologischen Fakultät of the Ruhr-Universität Bochum, before becoming emeritus professor in 1995. He was a member of the Nordrhein-Westfälische Akademie der Wissenschaften und der Künste and since 2002 honorary professor of the Humboldt-Universität Berlin.

== Bibliography ==
- Martin Brecht, Johannes Wallmann, Oswald Bayer: Festschrift für Johannes Wallmann zum 65. Geburtstag: Ein Jahrbuch zur Geschichte des neueren Protestantismus. Vandenhoeck & Ruprecht, 1996, ISBN 3-525-55893-7

== Selected publications ==
Co-editor of the yearbook Pietismus und Neuzeit and the Hallesche Forschungen.

- Kirchengeschichte Deutschlands seit der Reformation. Mohr Verlag, Tübingen, 1993, 4., durchges. Aufl., ISBN 3-16-145913-X
- Der Pietismus. Vandenhoeck und Ruprecht, Göttingen, 2005, ISBN 3-525-03702-3
- Johannes Wallmann und Udo Sträter (Hrsg.): Halle und Osteuropa : zur europäischen Ausstrahlung des hallischen Pietismus. Niemeyer-Verlag, Tübingen, 1998, ISBN 3-484-84001-3
- Philipp Jakob Spener und die Anfänge des Pietismus. Mohr Verlag, Tübingen, 1986, 2., überarb. u. erw. Aufl., ISBN 3-16-144979-7
- Der Theologiebegriff bei Johann Gerhard und Georg Calixt. Mohr (Siebeck) Verlag, Tübingen, 1961, Erschien auch als Diss., Zürich
- Theologie und Frömmigkeit im Zeitalter des Barock, Gesammelte Aufsätze, Mohr Siebeck, Tübingen 1995, ISBN 978-3-16-146351-8
