= Break fast =

First meal eaten after a fast

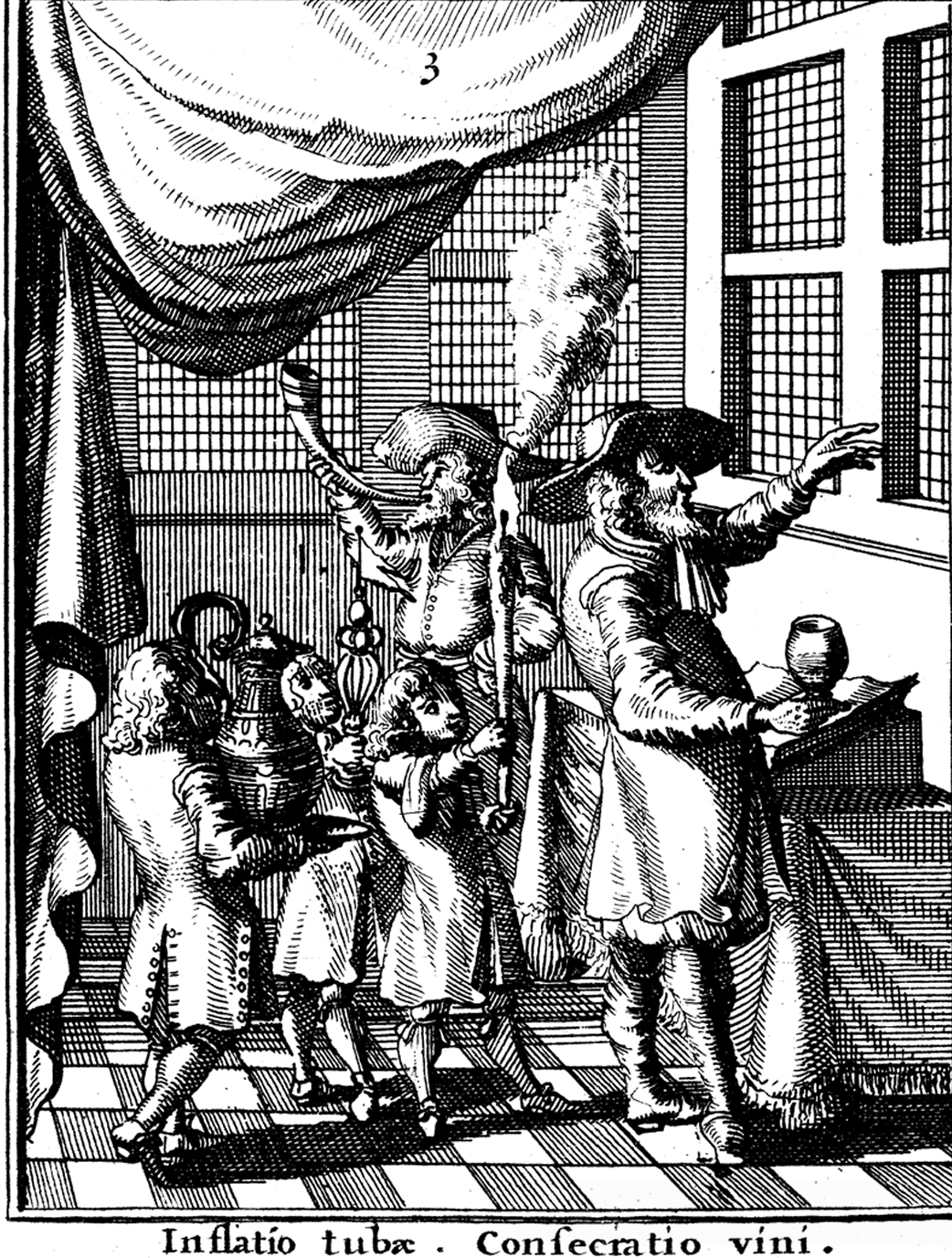
1657 engraving of rituals to end Yom Kippur. One man makes kiddush while another blows the shofar. A child holds the havdala candle, another holds the besamim, and a third carries in food.

A break-fast is a meal eaten after fasting.

In Judaism, a break fast is the meal eaten after Ta'anit (religious days of fasting), such as Yom Kippur. During a Jewish fast, no food or drink is consumed, including bread and water. The two major fasts of Yom Kippur and Tisha B'Av last about 25 hours, from before sundown on the previous night until after sundown on the day of the fast. Other shorter fasts during the year begin at dawn and end after sunset - this includes four almost universally observed fasts, as well fasts practiced by some such as Fast of Behav, Yom Kippur Katan, Shovevim, and fasts declared by a local community.

== Occurrence ==
A break-fast follows each of the major Jewish fast days of Yom Kippur and Tisha B'Av, as well as the four minor fast days of Fast of Gedalia, Tenth of Tevet, Fast of Esther, and Seventeenth of Tammuz. It also occurs following fasts practiced by some such as Fast of Behav, Yom Kippur Katan, Shovevim, and fasts declared by a local community.

== Description ==
Sometimes the fast is broken with tea and cake before eating a full meal. A drink of milk or juice before the post-fast meal helps the body to readjust and diminishes the urge to eat too much or too rapidly.

Customs for the first food eaten after the Yom Kippur fast differ. Iranian Jews often eat a mixture of shredded apples mixed with rose water called "faloodeh seeb." Polish and Russian Jews will have tea and cake. Syrian and Iraqi Jews eat round sesame crackers that look like mini-bagels. Turkish and Greek Jews sip a sweet drink made from melon seeds. Some people start with herring to replace the salt lost during fasting. North African Jews prepare butter cookies known as ghribi/qurabiya ("ribo" among Moroccan Jews) for the meal after the Yom Kippur fast. Among North American Ashkenazi Jews, the custom is to break the Yom Kippur fast with bagels, cream cheese, cucumbers and tomatoes, and lox or whitefish, often followed by coffee and smetene kuchen (trans. "coffee cake").

Orthodox Jews generally do not eat meat or drink wine at the break-fast after Tisha B'Av because the burning of the Temple on the 9th of Av is said to have continued until noon on the 10th of Av. Even when the 9th of Av falls on Shabbat and Tisha B'Av is observed on the 10th, wine and meat are customarily still not consumed at the break fast, although in such a case all other Nine Days restrictions end with the fast.

== In Islam ==
In Islam, fasting mostly occurs during the month of Ramadan where Muslims fast for the whole duration of the month for around 30 continuous days. The fasting starts at dawn and ends by sunset where the first meal "break fast" is eaten (Iftar). During the time of fasting no form of food or drink is consumed.

== In Mormonism ==
In The Church of Jesus Christ of Latter-day Saints, members fast for two meals on the first Sunday of every month. A "break the fast" is a common cultural event, especially among single adult congregations, where a congregation will hold a large potluck or meal at the end of the day.

== See also ==
- Breakfast
