= Yaaleh V'Yavo =

Jewish prayer

Yaaleh V'Yavo (Hebrew: יעלה ויבוא, "May [our remembrance] arise and come") is a Jewish prayer that is added to the liturgy on the Three Pilgrimage Festivals and Rosh Chodesh. It is inserted into both the Amidah and Birkat Hamazon. It requests that God "remember" his people for merit by granting them blessings, deliverance, and mercy on that auspicious day.

== Placement ==
Yaaleh V'Yavo is recited during all major festivals and Chol HaMoed days, but it is not recited on minor festivals like Hanukkah and Purim. As a rule, any day on which a Mussaf sacrifice was brought in the Temple in Jerusalem calls for its recitation.

On major holidays, it is recited within the middle blessing of the Amidah, "Atah Bechartanu". On lesser holidays (Rosh Chodesh and Chol HaMoed), it is recited in the middle of the "Ritzeh" (or "Avodah") blessing of the Amidah. In Birkat Hamazon, it is recited within the "Boneh Yerushalayim" blessing. (Note: As a prayer with much discussion of Jerusalem, Halachic sources (ex. Shulchan Aruch 188, Tosafot) take its location there as a given. However, no Talmudic source fixes it there explicitly. For instance, Tosefta Berakhot 3:8:6 and Berakhot 48b:3 only dictate that the "Sanctification of the Day" for Shabbat be placed in that blessing.) Yaaleh V'Yavo is omitted from every Mussaf Amidah, with the exception of Mussaf of Rosh Hashanahl in the Sephardic rite. It is not recited on any fast day besides Yom Kippur.

Some of the themes within Yaaleh V'Yavo correspond with the themes of these blessings—namely, the rebuilding of Jerusalem and the restoration of the Temple. In regards to its placement within "Ritzeh" specifically, the Talmud frames this blessing as the correct place to include prayers for the future. Later scholars explain this to include Yaaleh V'Yavo.

== History ==
The Tosefta (Berachot 3:14) is the earliest source for the insertion of an additional prayer for special days. There, it is alternatively referred to as a "Sanctification of the Day" (קדושת היום) or a "Reference to the Occasion" (מעין המאורע). By the Rabbinic period, the Amoraim settled upon locations in the liturgy to include an additional prayer for special days.

The early Rabbinic literature did not provide a sample of the prayer. Although the archaic language of Yaaleh V'Yavo led some scholars to declare it ancient liturgy composed by the speculated Council of Yavne under the auspices of Rabban Gamliel in the first century CE, this attribution was met with skepticism, since a "Reference to the Occasion" beginning with the words "Yaaleh V'Yavo" does not appear in any Jewish texts until the 7th century.

Yaaleh V'Yavo is first mentioned by name in the context of festival prayers in tractate Soferim (c. 6th – 8th century). It then appears in the responsa of various Geonim, most importantly in a responsum by Rabbi Paltoi ben Abaye (c. 850). Rabbi ben Paltoi notes that some communities used Yaaleh V'Yavo for all festivals, while others used it only on Rosh Hashanah in Mussaf and had unnamed alternatives for other festivals. He explains this variation is due to local custom, and the specific prayer used does not affect fulfilling the obligation to include a "Reference to the Occasion". (Note: Compare the variant text in "ספר הפרדס לרש"י - שלמה בן יצחק (רש"י), 1040-1105 (page 255 of 400)". hebrewbooks.org. which doesn't allow for this proof.)

His responsum led other scholars to believe that Yaaleh V'Yavo was originally composed for the Mussaf of Rosh Hashanah, specifically for the Zichronot ("Remembrances") section of the poetic Amidah known as "Tekiata D'Vei Rav" (תקיעתא דבי רב, "the Mussaf Shofar-Amidah of Rav's Yeshiva"), which is still used to this day. From there, the prayer was borrowed for use on other festivals. The theme of remembrance in Yaaleh V'Yavo supports this theory.

Joseph Heinemann, while in the early stages of developing his form-critical approach to liturgical study, realized that another perspective of this prayer's history was possible. In his view, Jewish prayers and liturgical practices emerged naturally among the people in various social settings (e.g., the synagogue, study hall, etc.) before being systematized and standardized by the Rabbis. Therefore, searching for an original text that represents a singular, original version is not productive. In this vein, multiple versions of prayer were developed concurrently in different circles and used interchangeably. Due to the similarities between Yaaleh V'Yavo and the "Boneh Yerushalayim" prayer in Birkat Hamazon, Heinemann suggests that the former was originally composed as a version of the latter, meant for use specifically on Rosh Hashanah, the day of judgement in Judaism. This theory also explains why Yaaleh V'Yavo incorporates both themes: Remembrance and Jerusalem.

Aaron Kellerman studied an early version of Yaaleh V'Yavo from post-Talmudic Israel and argues that it is an early piyyut (פִּיוּט, 'poetry') from the pre-Rabbinic era of composition (i.e., pre-6th century). Other scholars, including Ezra Fleischer, who studied the same version disagreed; instead, they assumed that it follows a style typical of archaic liturgical prose.

== Nusach ==
As with many early Jewish prayers, we find two recensions of Yaaleh V'Yavo in medieval times: the "Babylonian" rite and the "Palestinian" rite. Both rites are quite similar and are recognizably the same prayer. With the decline of the Geonic centers in Israel (ca. 11th century), the Palestinian rite slowly fell into disuse as the majority of Jewish communities adopted the laws and practices of the Babylonian centers. The Babylonian rite appears in Geonic Siddurim (Note: See for example "סדור רב סעדיה גאון - סעדיה בן יוסף, אלפיומי, 882-942 (page 162 of 497)". hebrewbooks.org. and סדר ר עמרם גאון (מוסד הרב קוק) ח"ב מד) and has remained considerably stable since then, with minor variations arising in different communities.

One clear distinction between the modern Sephardic and Ashkenazic Nuschaot of Yaaleh V'Yavo is seen in the inclusion (Sephardic) or exclusion (Ashkenazic) of the words "מקרא קודש" on the holidays. (Note: See Kellerman on the history of this development.) Even within Ashkenazic siddurim, there are discrepancies which words are prefaced with a vav (and).
