= Ta'anit =

Fasting in Judaism

A ta'anit or taynis (Biblical Hebrew תַּעֲנִית taʿaniṯ or צוֹם ṣom) is a fast in Judaism in which one abstains from all food and drink, including water.

== Purposes ==
A Jewish fast may have one or more purposes, including:

Atonement for sins
Fasting is not considered the primary means of acquiring atonement; rather, sincere regret for and rectification of wrongdoing is key. Nevertheless, fasting is conducive to atonement, for it tends to precipitate contrition. Therefore, the Bible requires fasting on Yom Kippur. Because, according to the Hebrew Bible, hardship and calamitous circumstances can occur as a result of sin, fasting is often undertaken by the community or by individuals to achieve atonement and avert catastrophe. Most of the Talmud's Tractate Ta'anit ("Fast[s]") is dedicated to the protocol involved in declaring and observing fast days.

Commemorative mourning
Most communal fast days that are set permanently in the Jewish calendar serve this purpose. These fasts include: Tisha B'Av, the Seventeenth of Tammuz, the Tenth of Tevet, and the Fast of Gedalia. The purpose of a fast of mourning is the demonstration that those fasting are impacted by and distraught over earlier loss. This serves to heighten appreciation of that which was lost.

Supplication
For example, the Fast of Esther

Commemorative gratitude
Since food and drink are corporeal needs, abstinence from them serves to provide a unique opportunity for focus on the spiritual. Indeed, the Midrash explains that fasting can potentially elevate one to the exalted level of the ministering angels. This dedication is considered appropriate gratitude to God for providing salvation. Additionally, by refraining from such basic physical indulgence, one can more greatly appreciate the dependence of humanity on God, leading to appreciation of God's beneficence in sustaining His creations.

== Jewish fast days ==
=== Full fast ===
A Jewish full fast lasts from sunset to darkness the following night. There are two Jewish full fast days:

- Yom Kippur – the only fast day mentioned in the Torah (Leviticus 23:26-32)
- Tisha B'Av

The two full fast days carry four restrictions in addition to eating and drinking – one may not wash one's body, wear leather shoes, use colognes, oils or perfumes, or have sexual relations. Yom Kippur also has all the restrictions of Shabbat, and Tisha B'Av has restrictions somewhat similar to a mourner sitting shiva.

The Halakha status of the two Jewish full fasts is that they are obligatory.

=== Minor fasts ===
Minor fasts are observed from dawn to nightfall, without additional restrictions. There are four public minor fasts:

- Fast of Gedalia (Tzom Gedalia)
- Tenth of Tevet (Asara B'Tevet)
- Fast of Esther (Ta'anit Esther)
- Seventeenth of Tammuz (Shiva Asar B'Tammuz)

There are additional fasts that are practiced in some communities or by individuals, but are not universally observed like the ones listed above. Since these are dependent on local custom, it is impossible to give a comprehensive list. Nevertheless, some of the most commonly observed ones include:

- Fast of Behav
- Yom Kippur Katan
- Shovevim

==== Liturgy ====
During the four minor fasts a number of changes is made to the liturgy:

- The Torah portion for Fast Days (Exodus 32:11-14, 34:1-10), commonly called VaYechal after the first word of the portion, is read during the Shacharit and Mincha services. After the Torah Reading at the Mincha service, Ashkenazi communities read the Haftorah for Fast Days (Isaiah 55:6-56:8), which is commonly called Dirshu after its first word.
- During the Shacharit service, Selichot are recited.
- In most communities which follow the Eastern Ashkenazic rite, Avinu Malkeinu is recited during the Shacharit and Mincha services except at occasions when Tachanun is omitted. It is not recited on fast days in the Western Ashkenazic rite or by Sephardim, and a few Eastern Ashkenazic communities still follow the older practice of reciting it only during the Ten Days of Repentance.
- Aneinu is by the Chazzan as its own blessing during the Shacharit and Mincha services. Individuals recite it as in addition in the Shema Koleinu blessing of the Amidah; in Ashkenazic communities, it is recited by individuals only at Mincha, in Sephardic communities it is recited also during the Shacharit service, and in some Yemenite communities it is recited even in the Maariv service on the night before the fast, even though the fast has not yet begun.

=== Four fasts ===
The major and minor fasts that commemorate events having to do with the destruction of the Jerusalem Temple are called the four fasts. They are:

- Ninth of Av (Tisha B'Av, full fast)
- Fast of Gedalia (Tzom Gedalia, minor fast)
- Tenth of Tevet (Asara B'Tevet, minor fast)
- Seventeenth of Tammuz (Shiva Asar B'Tammuz, minor fast)

The minor fasts are mentioned in the Book of Zechariah as fasts in memory of the destruction of the First Temple. Zechariah 7 mentions the fasts in the fifth and seventh months, and Zechariah 8 mentions four dates: "the fast of the fourth month and the fast of the fifth and the fast of the seventh and the fast of the tenth".

However, after the Second Temple was built, these fasts ceased to be observed. The Talmud establishes general rules for observance of the fasts in later periods: if the Temple stands the fasts are not observed and instead have the status of Yom Tov and observed as holidays; if the Jewish people are being persecuted the fasts are observed; if neither of those is the case, then "should they desire, they fast, should they desire not to, they do not fast." Nowadays, the Jewish people are accustomed to observing these fasts, making them obligatory.

=== Customary fasts ===
Customary fasts are only practiced by specific communities, or by especially pious individuals, or by certain classes of individuals. Most of these fasts, like the minor fasts, last from dawn to dusk.

- Fast of the Firstborn, Ta'anit Bechorot, observed on the day preceding Passover.
- Yom Kippur Katan (literally, the little Yom Kippur) – held on the day before Rosh Hodesh in most months.
- Fast of Behav – This is a custom to fast on the first Monday, Thursday and then the following Monday of the Jewish months of Cheshvan and Iyar—shortly following the Sukkot and Passover holidays.
- Shovavim Tat, 6 or 8 weeks of repentance when the first 6 or 8 liturgical readings from Exodus are read. Some fast every day (except Shabbat), some once or twice a week, either Monday and Thursday, Thursday only, or Friday only.
- Fast commemorating the Khmelnytsky massacres, held on Twentieth of Sivan.
- Fast of Samuel: Held on 28th Iyar. Not widely observed.
- Fast of Moses on Seventh of Adar.
- A custom exists for a bride and groom to fast on the day of their wedding. It is observed by Ashkenazi and some Sephardi Jews. (This applies both to those who are marrying for the first time and to those who are remarrying.) They fast from daybreak until after the chuppah, eating their first meal during their yichud seclusion at the end of the ceremony. This custom is not recorded in the Talmud, and first appears in Sefer HaRokeach.

Customarily, special prayers called selichot are added in the morning prayer services on many of these days.

=== Breaking the fast ===
A break fast is a meal that takes places following a fast. After Yom Kippur, it is viewed as a festive meal. To avoid indigestion, some choose to avoid heavy foods such as meat, observe a custom of eating light dairy foods in moderation.

== Other abstentions from food ==
From the Gemara there is a prohibition against eating before Shacharit, the morning prayers, except for those who are ill or unable to concentrate.

== See also ==
- Sauma in Mandaeism
