= Tenth of Tevet =

Fast day in Judaism

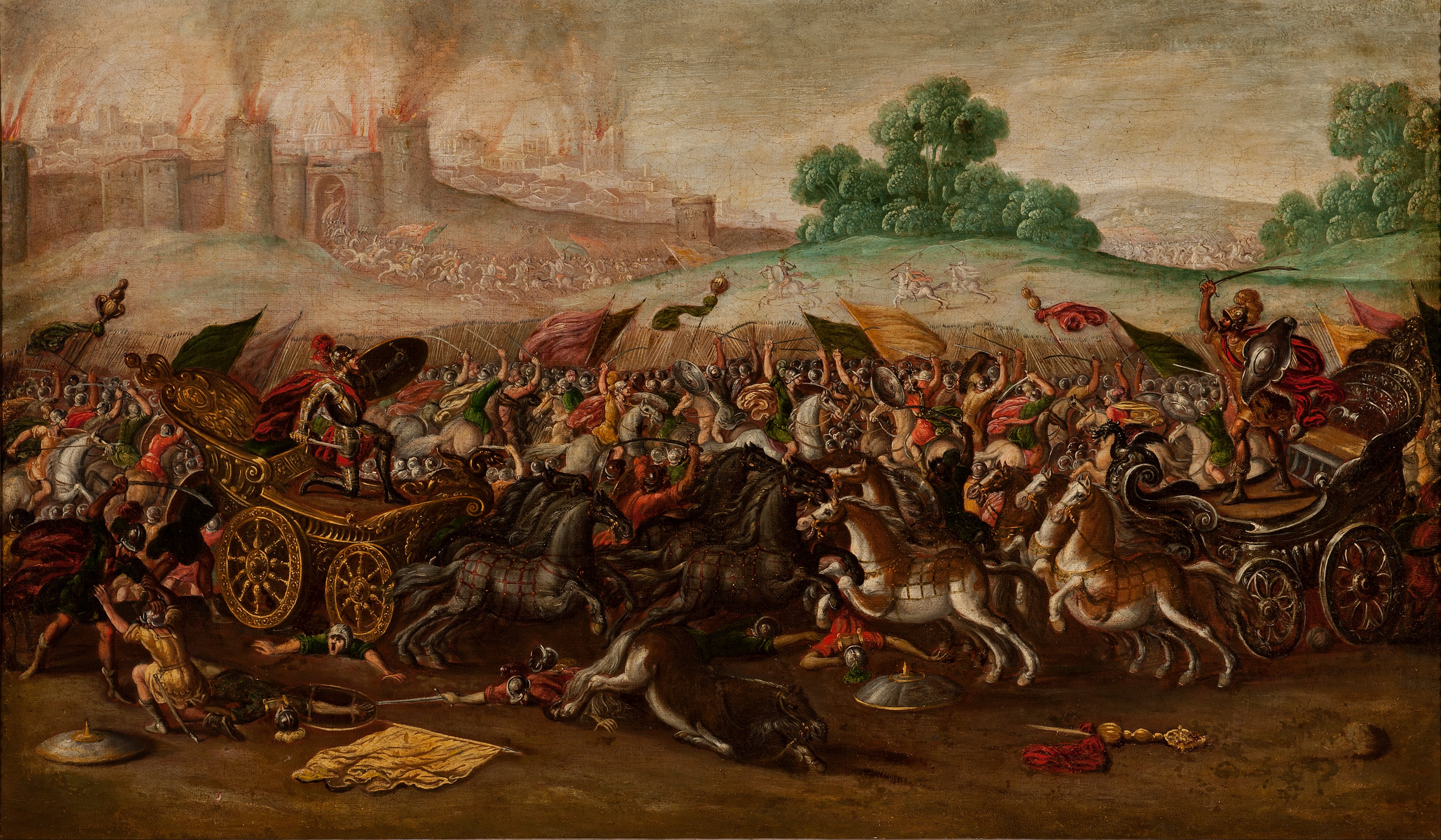
- The Burning of Jerusalem by Nebuchadnezzar’s Army
- Official name: Hebrew: עשרה בטבת
- Type: Jewish religious, national
- Significance: Remembers the 587 BC siege of Jerusalem by Nebuchadnezzar II of Babylonia
- Observances: Fasting
- Begins: 10 Tevet at 72 minutes before sunrise
- Ends: at the beginning of 11 Tevet
- 2025 date: December 30, 2025
- Frequency: Annual (per the Hebrew calendar) (Note: On the secular (Gregorian) calendar, some years may have no occurrence while others have two. For example, there was an occurrence in December 2021. The next occurred in January 2023 (since 2022 was skipped), and another occurred in December 2023 (with two occurrences in 2023).)

Tenth of Tevet (Hebrew: י' בטבת), or Asarah BeTevet (pronounced [a.saˈra be.teˈvet]; עשרה בטבת), is the tenth day of the Hebrew month of Tevet and a fast day (Ta'anit) in Judaism. It is the only minor fast observed even on the Friday preceding Shabbat (Erev Shabbat)—on which fasting is typically prohibited—from before dawn to nightfall (or Kiddush); other fast days are postponed until Shabbat ends. The fast mourns the 587 BCE siege of Jerusalem by Nebuchadnezzar II of Babylonia—an event that began on Tevet 10 and culminated in the destruction of Solomon's Temple (i.e., the First Temple), the downfall of the Kingdom of Judah, and the Babylonian exile of the Judeans.

The fast day is not usually thought to be related to Hanukkah, but it falls a week after the end of that festival. Whether the 10th of Tevet occurs seven or eight days after the last day of Hanukkah depends on whether the preceding Hebrew month of Kislev has 29 or 30 days in the given Hebrew year.

== History ==
According to 2 Kings 25:1–25, on the 10th day of the 10th month of Tevet, (Note: Counting from Nisan, per Exodus 12:1–2; see Hebrew calendar § New year.) in the ninth year of Zedekiah's reign (588 BCE), Nebuchadnezzar II, the second emperor of the Neo-Babylonian Empire, began the siege of Jerusalem. Eighteen months later, on the 17th of Tammuz at the end of the eleventh year of Zedekiah's reign (586 BCE), his army broke through the city's walls. The Romans would similarly break through the walls of Jerusalem on the 17th of Tammuz during their siege of Jerusalem in 70 CE. (In the biblical calendar, each year in the reign of the Kings of Judah or Israel is dated from 1 Nissan. Hence, Tevet (tenth month) of Year 9 of Zedekiah is only 18 months before Tammuz (fourth month) of Year 11 of Zedekiah.)

The siege ended with the destruction of the Temple three weeks later, on Tisha B'Av, the end of the kingdoms. The elite of Judah were taken from the land with the Babylonian exile. The Tenth of Tevet is part of the cycle of three fasts connected with these events.

The first reference to the Tenth of Tevet as a fast appears in Zechariah 8, where it is called the "fast of the tenth month". Rabbi Shimon, as recorded in tractate Rosh Hashanah 18b:7 of the Talmud, was of the opinion that the "fast of the tenth month" refers to the fifth of Tevet—when, according to Ezekiel 33:21, news of the destruction of the Temple reached those already in exile in Babylon. However, the tenth is the date observed today, according to the opinion of Rabbi Akiva. Other references to the fast and the affliction can be found in the Book of Ezekiel (the siege) and the Book of Jeremiah.

According to tradition, as described by the Jewish liturgy for the day's selichot, the fast also commemorates other calamities that occurred throughout Jewish history on the Tenth of Tevet and the two days preceding it:

- On the eighth of Tevet one year during the 3rd century BCE, a time of Hellenistic rule of Judea during the Second Temple period, Ptolemy II Philadelphus, the Ptolemaic pharaoh of Egypt, ordered the translation of the Hebrew Bible into Greek. This work later became known as the Septuagint. Seventy-two sages were placed in solitary confinement and ordered to translate the Torah into Greek.

Judaism sees this event as a tragedy, reflecting a deprivation and debasement of the divine nature of the Torah and a subversion of its spiritual and literary qualities. They reasoned that the Torah's legal codes and deeper layers of meaning would be lost upon translation from the original Hebrew. Many Jewish laws are formulated in terms of specific Hebrew words employed in the Torah; without the original Hebrew wording, the authenticity and essence of the legal system would be damaged. The mystical ideas contained in the Torah are also drawn from the original Hebrew. As such, these would not be accessed by individuals studying the Torah in Greek (or any other language) alone.

Two things, however, rendered the Septuagint unwelcome in the long run to the Jews. Its divergence from the accepted text (afterward called the Masoretic) was too evident; and it therefore could not serve as a basis for theological discussion or for homiletic interpretation. This distrust was accentuated by the fact that it had been adopted as Sacred Scripture by the new faith.

- On the ninth of Tevet, "something happened, but we do not know what it was..." (Shulchan Aruch). The selichot liturgy for the day states that Ezra, the great leader who brought some Jews back to the Holy Land from the Babylonian exile and who ushered in the era of the Second Temple, died on this day, and this is verified by the Kol Bo. But according to the earlier sources (the Geonim as recorded by Bahag and cited in Tur Orach Chaim 580), the specific tragedy of 9 Tevet is unknown. Some manuscripts of Simeon Kayyara (not those available to the Tur) add that Ezra and Nechemiah died on this day—but only after first stating that Chazal gave no reason for why the day is tragic. Other suggestions are given as to why the ninth of Tevet is notable as well.

== Observance ==
As with all minor ta'anit (Jewish days of fasting), the Tenth of Tevet begins at dawn (alot ha-shahar) and concludes at nightfall (tzeit hakochavim). Following the general rules of minor fasts as outlined in the Shulchan Aruch, and in contrast to Tisha B'Av, there are no additional requirements beyond fasting (e.g., the prohibitions against bathing and wearing leather shoes).

Further akin to other minor fasts, Halakha exempts individuals who are ill, as well as pregnant and nursing persons who struggle with fasting. The Mishnah Berurah notes that it is still commendable to observe all the restrictions of Tisha B'Av on the minor fast days except for the restriction of wearing leather shoes. Even so, it says, one should not refrain from bathing in preparation for Shabbat when the Tenth of Tevet falls on a Friday.

A Torah reading, the Aneinu prayer in the Amidah, and the Avinu Malkeinu prayer are added at both shacharit and mincha services in many communities unless the fast falls on Friday, when Tachanun and Avinu Malkeinu are not said at mincha. At shacharit services, Selichot are also said, and at mincha in Ashkenazi congregations, the Haftarah is read.

The Tenth of Tevet is the only minor fast day that can coincide with Friday in the current Hebrew calendar. When it does, the unusual event of a Torah and Haftarah reading at the mincha right before Shabbat occurs. This is fairly rare; the most recent occurrence was 2025 (as the 2024 observance), and the next time will be 2034. If it falls on Friday, the fast must be observed until nightfall, even though Shabbat begins before sunset (up to 72 minutes earlier, depending on the halakhic authority), and even though this requires one to enter Shabbat hungry from the fast, something typically avoided. It cannot be determined for sure whether other fasts would have the same ruling, because no other fast day can fall out on Friday, except for the Fast of the Firstborn when Passover begins on Friday night. (Note: However, the Ninth of Av can fall on Saturday night into Sunday. In such a case, one observes all stringencies of the fast (except the prohibition of wearing leather shoes) from sunset on Saturday evening.)

Although this fast is considered a minor fast, David Abudarham attributed to it an additional theoretical stringency not shared by any other fast except Yom Kippur, namely that if the Tenth of Tevet were to fall out on a Shabbat, this fast would be observed on Shabbat. (This cannot happen under the current arrangement of the Hebrew calendar.) The reason the fasts of the Tenth of Tevet and Yom Kippur must be observed on the actual day on which they occur is because of the phrase "the very day" (עצם היום הזה) is used about both of them, in Ezekiel 24:2 about the Tenth of Tevet, and similarly for Yom Kippur in Leviticus 23:28. This view is rejected by the Beit Yosef and all other major halakhic authorities, but was popularized by Rabbi Moses Sofer, who wrote a commentary based on the philosophy behind this view.

Although the Tenth of Tevet is an annual observance on the Jewish calendar, its placement toward the end of the Gregorian calendar year means that in some Gregorian years, there is no observance of the fast, while in other years, the fast is observed twice. Thus, the Tenth of Tevet did not occur at all in 2019. Instead, the "2019" observance of the fast took place in January 2020, while the subsequent observance occurred in December 2020.

=== Day of general kaddish ===
The Chief Rabbinate of Israel chose to observe the Tenth of Tevet as a "general Kaddish day" (yom hakaddish ha'klalli) to allow the relatives of those whose yahrtzeit (anniversary of their death) is unknown, including Holocaust victims, to mourn their loss. Relatives may observe the traditional yahrtzeit practices for the deceased, including lighting a memorial candle, learning mishnayot, and reciting Kaddish. According to the policy of the Chief Rabbinate in Israel, the memorial prayer is also recited in synagogues after the reading of the Torah at the morning services. To some religious Jews, this day is preferable as a remembrance day to Yom HaShoah since the latter occurs in the month of Nisan, in which mourning is traditionally prohibited.

== See also ==
- Fast of Gedalia
- Fast of Esther
- Fast of Seventeenth of Tammuz
- Fast of Tisha B'Av
