= Berakhot (tractate) =

Tractate of the Talmud about blessings and prayers, particularly the Shema and the Amidah

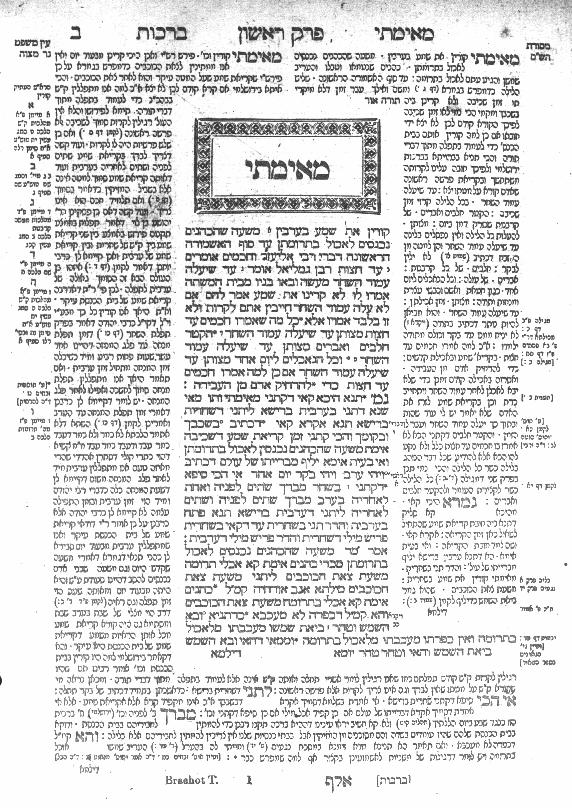
- The first page of tractate Berakhot

Tractate of the Talmud
- English: Blessings
- Seder: Zeraim
- Number of mishnahs: 57
- Chapters: 9
- Babylonian Talmud pages: 64
- Jerusalem Talmud pages: 68
- Tosefta chapters: 6

Berakhot (Hebrew: בְּרָכוֹת, romanized: bərāḵōṯ, lit. 'blessings') is the first tractate of Seder Zeraim (Order of Seeds) of the Mishnah and the Talmud. The tractate discusses the laws of Jewish prayer—particularly of the Shema Yisrael and the Amidah—and blessings for various circumstances.

Since a large part of the tractate is concerned with the voluminous berakhot of Judaism, many of which begin either the formal liturgical element "Blessed are you, LORD our God," the tractate is named for the initial word of said liturgical element: barukh (בָּרוּךְ, 'blessed').

Berakhot is the only tractate in Seder Zeraim to have Gemara—rabbinical analysis of and commentary on the Mishnah—in the Babylonian Talmud. There are, however, tractates in the Jerusalem Talmud for all of Seder Zeraim. There is also a Tosefta for this tractate.

The Halakha detailed in this tractate has shaped the liturgies of all the Jewish communities since the era of the Amoraim, and it continues to be observed by traditional Jewish communities with only minor variations, as expounded upon by subsequent halakhic codes.

== Subject matter ==
The Mishnah of this tractate deals with aspects of the daily Jewish prayer services, primarily the laws about formal prayers and blessings, and only infrequently or incidentally with the content, theology, or rationales for said prayers. These aspects are discussed more at length in the Tosefta, Gemara, and passages in the Midrash. Although the Talmud identifies varying degrees of direct Hebrew Biblical basis for the topics discussed in the tractate, the Mishnah organizes the material by topic, with occasional direct references to biblical sources.

In their introduction to the tractate in the 1948 Soncino Press edition of the Talmud, Rabbi Isidore Epstein and Maurice Simon note the three broad liturgical categories addressed in Berakhot:

- Recitation of Shema Yisrael (שְׁמַע יִשְׂרָאֵל, 'Listen, Israel!'; oftentimes referred to only as "the Shema" by contemporary Jews) every morning and evening.
- The central prayer of each service, recited silently while standing—called the Amidah (עֲמִידָה, 'Standing') or Shemoneh Esrei (שְׁמוֹנֶה עֶשְׂרֵה, 'Eighteen').
- Blessings recited for enjoying food, drinks, fragrances, and on important occasions.

The initial three chapters cover the Shema, the following two focus on the Amidah, and the last four discuss various related topics blessings.

The biblical basis for the discussions of the Shema is derived from Deuteronomy 6:4–9, (Note: Deut 6:4–9) Deuteronomy 11:13–21, (Note: Deut 11:13–21) and Numbers 15:37–41 of the Torah. (Note: Num 15:37–41) The blessing of Birkat Hamazon (בִּרְכַּת הַמָּזוֹן, 'Blessing [of] the Food') is derived from Deuteronomy 8:10, (Note: Deut 8:10) and Psalm 55:18 and Daniel 6:11 are referenced by Chazal (חֲז׳׳ל, Ḥazal) in their halakhic rulings regarding the recitation of prayer generally and the requirement to pray three services daily, respectively. (Note: Psalms 55:18) (Note: Daniel 6:11)

=== Shema ===
The obligation to recite Shema Yisrael is a Tanakhic mitzvah (מִצְוָה, 'commandment') recorded in Deuteronomy 6:7 and Deuteronomy 11:19 of the Torah. (Note: Deuteronomy 6:7) (Note: Deuteronomy 11:19) Religious Jews believe that reciting the Shema satisfies their duty to acknowledge the kingship and kingdom of God by proclaiming, "the LORD is One" (Deuteronomy 6:4).

In Berakhot 2a:8–9, Chazal explain that the commandments in Deuteronomy 6:4–9 and 11:13–21 require Jews to recite the two paragraphs of the Shema twice daily—once in the evening ("when you lie down") and once in the morning ("when you rise up"). Additionally, Chazal specify the halakhic times (zmanim; זְמַנִּים, '[appointed] times') at which the Shema must be recited, delineate conditions for its recitation, and identify categories of individuals (e.g., women) and contexts in which the obligation does not apply.

The Mishnah also mandates the addition of a third section to the Shema (Numbers 15:37–41), relating the commandment of tzitzit (צִיצִית, ṣîṣît, 'tassel'), and the daily obligation to recall the Exodus.

=== Prayer ===
The Chazal discuss the Amida, the principal rabbinic prayer recited quietly while standing, in detail. Originally, the weekday Amida had eighteen blessings, each beginning with "Blessed are you, LORD our God". A nineteenth, the Birkat haMinim, was added during the Talmudic period.

The Mishnah takes the structure and text of the prayer as a given, and tefilla as a general concept refers to the regular prayers instituted by the members of the Great Assembly and the Tannaim who followed them. Three daily prayer services were instituted: Shaḥarit during the morning hours until four hours of the day have passed, and corresponding to the morning daily sacrificial offering at the Temple in Jerusalem, Mincha during the afternoon, corresponding to the afternoon sacrificial offering and Maʿariv in the evening after nightfall. The times for these services are also connected in the tractate to the practices of the patriarchs Abraham, Isaac and Jacob.

On days when an additional offering was sacrificed in the Temple, namely Shabbat, Three Pilgrimage Festivals, the intermediate days of the Festivals, and at Rosh Chodesh (the new moon), an additional prayer service, the Mussaf, was recited between the morning and afternoon services.

The Mishnah and subsequent discussion in the Gemara consider the designated times for the three services; occasions when the full or abbreviated Amida should be recited; circumstances in which a person does not have to pray as typically required facing the Temple in Jerusalem; traditions about kavvana (required state of mind) when praying and the role of the hazzan who leads the repetition of the prayer when a minyan (quorum) is present.

=== Blessings ===
A "berakhah" is a formal liturgical unit that is usually formulated with the opening words "Blessed are you, Lord our God, King of the Universe..." The tractate discusses the blessings for specific occasions, and the Tosefta states that the theological rationale for this is a recognition that a person should not benefit from the world without first acknowledging that God is the source of the abundance.

The tractate formulates and describes the use of a number of categories of blessings, for the following:

- Enjoyment (birkhot ha'nehenin), recited in appreciation of physical enjoyment, including various blessings over food, drink, and fragrances; different blessings are assigned for vegetables, fruit, wine, baked goods, bread, and those items which do not directly come from produce of the earth, such as milk, meat, fish, and eggs.
- Performing a positive commandment (birkhot hamitzvot) such as the lighting of Sabbath candles, usually before the performance of the mitzvah, except for netilat yadai'im ("ritual washing of hands"), immersion in a mikveh to attain ritual purity, and the immersion of a convert, when the blessing is recited after the mitzvah is performed.
- Seeing awe-inspiring natural phenomena (birkhot ha're'iya) of various types, such as seeing the ocean, great mountains, a rainbow, or lightning; or seeing a place where miracles occurred for the Jewish people or for individuals, as well as for places where tragic or catastrophic events occurred.
- Special time-bound events (birkhot ha'zman) of two primary types — when performing a regular, but infrequent commandment such as the celebration of a Festival, or for an unusual occurrence, such as the redemption of a first born; and when enjoying something for the first time, such as wearing new clothes or eating a type of fruit for the first time in a season, and in general upon experiencing any unusual benefit or joy.

In addition to the blessings to be recited before eating, the tractate discusses the blessing ordained in the Torah, known as Birkat Hamazon ("the Grace after Meals"), to be recited after eating food; while the Torah obligation applies only to a meal that satisfies a person's hunger, the rabbis of the Mishna required that it be recited after eating a k'zayit measure of bread. When three or more men have eaten together, one of them is required to invite the others to recite the Grace after Meals in what is known as the zimmun ("invitation to bless").

The tractate formulates the berakha m'ayn shalosh ("blessing abridged from the three blessings" of the Grace after Meals), recited for food or drink made from any of the seven species — wheat, barley, grape, fig, pomegranates, olive (oil), and date (honey) — which are listed in the Hebrew Bible as being special products of the Land of Israel. For all other foods, besides bread or the products of the seven species, a one blessing berakha acharona ("blessing recited after eating or drinking") is recited.

The tractate also discusses the various requirements for Kiddush, the sanctification prayers recited over wine on Shabbat and Festivals, and Havdalah, the blessings for the ceremony recited at the end of the Shabbat and Festivals.

== Structure and content ==
The tractate consists of nine chapters and 57 paragraphs (mishnayot). It has a Gemara—rabbinical analysis of and commentary on the Mishnah—of 64 double-sided pages in the standard Vilna Edition Shas of the Babylonian Talmud and 68 double-sided pages in the Jerusalem Talmud. There is a Tosefta of six chapters for this tractate.

Tractate Berakhot in the Babylonian Talmud has the highest word-per-folio average due to its large amount of aggadic material. Some of these passages offer insights into the Rabbis' attitudes towards prayer, often defined as a plea for divine mercy, but they also cover many other themes, including biblical interpretations, biographical narratives, dream interpretation, and folklore.

An overview of the content of the chapters is as follows:

- Chapter 1 determines the time and the manner of the reading of the Shema in the evening and in the morning, and the number of blessings which precede and follow the reading; the controversy between the Houses of Hillel and Shammai regarding whether to stand, recline or sit during the recital; and the blessings before and after the Shema.
- Chapter 2 addresses the appropriate inner intention and attention (kavanah) for the recital of the Shema; whether reading it silently is considered a valid recital; whether incorrect pronunciation or other mistakes invalidate the recital; permission for laborers to say the Shema while working; and exemptions from recital due to inability to recite it with kavanah, such a recently married man; a series of parables regarding Rabban Gamaliel are cited to explain why exemptions may be acceptable.
- Chapter 3 continues to discuss total or partial exemption from this duty, such as for mourners, women, slaves, and minors, and the obligation of a person in a state of ritual uncleanness (tumah) to recite the Shema, Amidah and other blessings.
- Chapter 4 discusses the main prayer, the Shemoneh Esrei (or Amidah), and considers the appropriate time-frames in which to recite this prayer in the morning, afternoon and evening; the abbreviated Amidah's wording and when it is recited; reciting the Amidah while riding or driving; and Mussaf recited on Shabbat and festivals.
- Chapter 5 considers the necessity of preparing for prayer, praying with kavanah during the Amidah and the prohibition against interrupting one's prayer during the Amidah, guarding against error, especially regarding additions to or deviations in the form of the prayer; insertion of specific supplications such as for rain; and the course of action when the reader (shaliach tzibbur) makes a mistake while reciting the Amidah for the congregation.
- Chapter 6 examines the principle that before and after eating any food, one must recite a blessing. It determines the form of blessing for various kinds of food before and after. It discusses the blessing made on capers, for example, with the leaves of the caper plant, having a different blessing than the fruit, since they are fruit of the ground rather than fruit of a tree.
- Chapter 7 discusses the procedures for the concluding blessings known as Birkat Hamazon, (blessing for the sustenance) following a formal meal, usually defined by eating bread, at which three or more have eaten together, and the zimmun—invitation to join the grace.
- Chapter 8 formulates the rules for the washing of hands in connection with a meal, reciting grace over the wine-cup; Kiddush, the sanctification of Shabbat and Jewish holidays and Havdalah, the concluding ceremony of Shabbat; it also notes the disputes between the Houses of Shammai and Hillel regarding blessings recited at meals, especially to the order of their recital.
- Chapter 9 discusses various special blessings that can be made for many occasions, such as upon coming across a place where a miracle was performed or places of religious significance, or upon hearing thunder or seeing natural phenomena such as lightning or a rainbow, experiencing life milestones, and deliverance from danger; additionally, various additional instructions are given to ensure respect for the Temple Mount and the name of God in personal greetings and to resist heresy by stressing a belief in the world-to-come.

== Placement in the Order Zeraim ==
The topics of tractate Berakhot, relating to prayers and blessings, are seemingly quite different from the agricultural laws of the other tractates of Seder Zeraim (סֵדֶר זְרָעִים), and several rationales have been proposed for this placement.

According to Maimonides, because food is the foremost necessity for life, the laws concerning its production and use (i.e., the Halakha in Seder Zeraim) were placed at the beginning of the Mishnah. However, to first express gratitude to God for these gifts, the one non-agricultural tractate that opens this order is Berakhot.

Another explanation given is the fact that since reciting the Shema in the evening is the first religious duty of the day, this may account for the placement of the tractate at the beginning of the first Seder of the Mishnah—the important principle implied in the first question of the tractate, "From what time is it allowed to read the evening Shema?", is that the day is calculated from evening to evening and thus the Mishnah begins with the first commandment that a Jew is obligated to fulfill every day.

The Talmud, in tractate Shabbat 31a:10, records an explanation given by Shimon ben Lakish, who homiletically states that the first six terms in Isaiah 33:6 refer to the six orders of the Mishnah, and the first word, "emunah" ('faithfulness'), corresponds to Zeraim. This is seen as an explanation for why the regulations regarding prayers and blessings—especially those about reciting the Shema—were grouped with agricultural laws. These laws were viewed both as acts of faith through reliance on God and, according to the commentator Rashi (1040–1105 CE), as a demonstration of faithfulness in social relationships, through provisions such as dues to the poor, priests, and the Levites, as described in other tractates of Seder Zeraim.

== Historical context and influence ==
Composed towards the end of the Mishnaic period (c. 30 BCE - 200 CE) in the Roman province of Judea, the Mishnah of tractate Berakhot contains traditions covering the full range of sages from the period, from the Second Temple period until the end of the period of the Tannaim.

This tractate, along with other literature from the Second Temple era, especially the liturgical texts of the Dead Sea Scrolls, has provided scholars with a better understanding of the place of Jewish prayer in the broader evolution of Jewish worship of the time when it coexisted alongside the sacrificial worship of the Temple in Jerusalem. The tractate also provides significant information about the eating customs of the Jews of Upper Mesopotamia, called "Babylonia" (chapter 6), and of the Jews in Syria Palaestina, also called "Land of Israel", which were largely modeled on those of the Romans (chapter 8) by the time the Mishna was written (c. 200 CE).

Initially, the prayers instituted by the Talmudic rabbis were primarily learned and transmitted orally and prayer texts may have been flexible within these accepted structures. Only around the fourth century CE does synagogue architecture in the Land of Israel begin to consistently reflect the physical orientation towards Jerusalem required by rabbinic worship. By that time, prayer had become a function of the synagogue, with a shaliach tzibbur ("leader of the congregation") who recited the prayers out loud to enable those incapable of praying properly on their own to fulfill their obligations to participate by listening and responding, "amen".

Around the essential main prayers of the Shema and Amidah, other elements seem to have arisen, probably in the later Talmudic period during the time of the Amoraim. These included the recitation of psalms and other collections of biblical verses known as pesukei dezimra ("verses of song") prior to the main prayers in order to set an appropriate frame of mind for praying (Berakhot 5:1), and the recitation of individual prayers after the Amidah. These began as private supplications, including personal requests (Tosefot to Berakhot 3:10), but were gradually formalized. These elements took different forms in the Land of Israel and in Babylonia, as the findings of some of these texts in the Cairo Genizah have shown.

During the Talmudic period, the norm developed that the ideal language for prayer was Hebrew, although other languages were considered acceptable for many prayers (BT, Berakhot 13a). By the end of the Talmudic period, consensus existed as to the basic formulation of most prayers, though regional variations remained.

By the end of the Talmudic period (c. 500), two distinct prayer rites had developed, "Land of Israel" and "Babylonia". However, by the end of the Geonic period (c. 1038), the prayers of all the traditional Jewish ethnic divisions had largely conformed to the liturgy of the Babylonian Jewish community, and this has remained so until the present time, with only minor textual and structural variations among them.

== Liturgical uses ==
Amar Rabbi Elazar
A cantorial musical rendition of the last passage of Berakhot, incorporated into the Jewish liturgy, as sung by Cantor Meyer Kanewsky in 1919.

Both the Babylonian Talmud (BT) and Jerusalem Talmud (JT) include original prayers, many of which have been included in the Siddur, the daily prayer-book. The prayers are mostly the same in form and content in both Talmuds.

Many of the Talmudic sages arranged personal petitions that they would say at the conclusion of the Amidah, some of which are cited in this tractate Elohai ("My God"), the private meditation of the fourth century sage, Mar son of Ravina, as recorded in this tractate, has become universally accepted as the concluding meditation of the Amidah in the liturgies of all the Jewish communities. It begins with the words "My God, guard my tongue from evil and my lips from deceitful speech" and reflects the opening meditation of the Amidah "O Lord, open my lips so that my mouth may declare your praise" in that, having asked God to guide what to say in his presence, it now asks Him to guide what not to say in the presence of other human beings.

Yehi Ratzon ("May it be Your will"), the personal prayer of the late second–early third century sage, Rabbi Yehuda Hanasi, as recorded in this tractate (Talmud, b. Berakhot 16b), requesting protection from harmful events, people and temptations, which he recited every day after the morning service, has been incorporated at the beginning of the morning service in both the Ashkenazi and Sefardi liturgies, albeit with minor textual variants in each.

The second part of the Nishmat prayer, recited on Sabbath and Festivals, from the words "If our mouths were as full of song as the sea...we could not sufficiently praise You O Lord our God" is the text of a thanksgiving prayer for rain cited in this tractate (Talmud, b. Berakhot 59b).

Another prayer beginning with Elohai ("My God") and continuing with "the soul which you have given me is pure" is recorded in this tractate (BT, Berakhot 60b) expressing gratitude to God for restoring one's spirit upon awakening in the morning and for providing the person with the requirements for life and health. This text is the introduction to the series of fifteen blessings recited in the early morning service in both the Ashkenazi and Sefardi liturgies, in accordance with the teaching on Berakhot 60b, that as one experiences the phenomena of the new day, one should bless God for providing them.

The concluding statement of the tractate in both the Babylonian and Jerusalem Talmud (BT, Berakhot 64a) is Amar Rabbi Elazar ("Rabbi Elazer said"), "Torah scholars increase peace in the world..." and it is recited at the end of the Kabbalat Shabbat service welcoming the Sabbath on Friday night in the Ashkenazi liturgy, and towards the end of the Musaf service on Sabbaths and Festivals in both the Ashkenazi and Sefardi liturgies.

== See also ==
- List of Jewish prayers and blessings
