= Simeon HaPakoli =

1st century CE Judean rabbi

Simeon ha-Pakoli (Hebrew: שמעון הפקולי) was a tanna who lived in the late 1st century, in the second generation of the tanna'im. He was a contemporary of Gamaliel II at Yavne.

He arranged the eighteen blessings of the Amidah in the sequence they were handed down according to tractate Berakhot 28b.

The name Paqoli is said to have been derived from Simeon's occupation, which was that of a dealer in flax and wool. Nothing further is known concerning him.
