= Shalom Rav =

Jewish prayer

Shalom Rav (Hebrew: שָׁלוֹם רָב; "Abundant Peace") is a blessing that is recited at the end of the evening and afternoon Amidot in the Ashkenazic tradition. In Provence tradition, it was recited in all prayers. There is a different version of this prayer, Sim Shalom (שִׂים שָׁלוֹם), for the morning Amidah; Sim Shalom is also recited by all Ashkenazim at mincha of fast days, and in the Western Ashkenazic rite (as well as most communities in Israel) and Mincha on the Sabbath. In the Sefardic, Nusach Sefard, Nusach Ari, Italian Nusach and Romaniote rites, Sim Shalom is said at all prayer services.

== Versions in Song ==
In the denominations of Judaism where many prayers are sung rather than chanted, the most popular melody for Shalom Rav is the one composed by Jeff Klepper and Dan Freelander in 1974. It is a regular part of Shabbat services in Reform congregations around the world.

In many Jewish congregations, the cantor and congregation will sing the version of Shalom Rav by Ben Steinberg. The sheet music can be found in the Reform movement's "Shaarei Shira" Gates of Song book, at least in the 1987 edition.

== Text ==
Hebrew Text	Transliteration	Translation
שָׁלוֹם רָב עַל יִשְׂראֵל עַמְּֿךָ תָּשִׂים לְעוֹלָם	Shalom rav al Yisrael am'cha tasim l'olam	Grant abundant peace upon Israel your nation forever
כִּי אַתָּה הוּא מֶֽלֶךְ אָדוֹן לְכָל הַשָּׁלוֹם	Ki atah hu Melech Adon I'chol ha shalom	for you are King, Master of all peace.
וְטוֹב בְּעֵינֶֽיךָ לְבָרֵךְ אֶת עַמְּֿךָ יִשְׂרָאֵל	V'tov b'einecha I'vareich et am'cha Yisrael	And may it be good in your eyes to bless your nation Israel
בְּכָל עֵת וּבְכָל שָׁעָה בִּשְּׁלוֹמֶֽךָ	b'chol et uv'chol sha'ah bish'lomecha.	at all times and all hours with your peace.
בָּרוּךְ אַתָּה ה' הַמְבָרֵךְ אֶת עַמּוֹ יִשְׂרָאֵל בַּשָּׁלוֹם	Baruch atah Adonai ham'vareich et amo Yisrael bashalom.	Blessed are You, Hashem, who blesses His people Israel with peace. https://www.zemirotdatabase.org/view_song.php?id=316 From Zemirot Database
