= Gribi =

Gribi is a surname. Notable people with the surname include:

- Michelle Gribi (born 1992), Swiss curler
- Reto Gribi (born 1991), Swiss curler

== See also ==
- Ghribi, a surname
