= Shmuel ha-Katan =

1st-century CE Babylonian Jew and religious scholar

Shmuel ha-Katan (literally Samuel the Small, or Samuel the Lesser) was a Babylonian Jew considered a great early scholar in Jewish law. He was one of the second generation of Tannaim who served under the patriarch Gamliel II of Yavneh during the last two decades of the 1st century CE.

He composed some of the standard prayers of the Jewish liturgy. He wrote the Birkat HaMinim benediction, the 19th blessing in the silent prayer said three times daily, the Amidah.

He is said to have said, "Do not rejoice when your enemy falls".
