= Sim Shalom =

Sim Shalom (Hebrew: שִׂים שָׁלוֹם; "Grant Peace") is a blessing that is recited at the end of the morning Amidah and the Mincha Amidah during fast days in the Nusach Ashkenaz, and at mincha on Shabbat in the Western Ashkenazi rite and most communities in Israel; during the evening service and the Mincha service of non-fast days (or sabbath according to some traditions), a different version of this prayer, Shalom Rav (שָׁלוֹם רָב), is said instead. In the Sefardic, Nusach Sefard, Nusach Ari, Italian Nusach and Romaniote rites, Sim Shalom is said at all prayer services. In the nusach of Provence, Shalom Rav was recited in all prayers.

== Text ==
Hebrew Text	Hebrew Transliteration	Translation
שִׂים שָׁלוֹם טוֹבָה וּבְרָכָה חֵן וָחֶֽסֶד וְרַחֲמִים	Sim shalom tovah uverachah chen vachesed verachamim	Grant peace, goodness, blessing, grace, loving kindness, and mercy
עָלֵֽינוּ וְעַל כָּל יִשְׂרָאֵל עַמֶּֽךָ	Aleinu ve'al kol Yisra'el ammecha	to us and to all of Israel Your people
בָּרְכֵֽנוּ אָבִֽינוּ כֻּלָּֽנוּ כְּאֶחָד בְּאוֹר פָּנֶֽיךָ	Barechenu avinu kullanu ke'echad be'or paneicha	bless us, our Father, all of us as one with the light of Your face
כִּי בְאוֹר פָּנֶֽיךָ נָתַֽתָּ לָּֽנוּ ה' אֱלֹקינוּ	Ki ve'or paneicha natatta lanu adonai eloknu	for by the light of Your face You have given us, Hashem our God,
תּוֹרַת חַיִּים וְאַֽהֲבַת חֶֽסֶד וּצְדָקָה וּבְרָכָה וְרַחֲמִים וְחַיִּים וְשָׁלוֹם	Torat chayyim ve'ahavat chesed utzedakah uverachah verachamim vechayyim veshalom	the Torah of life, and love of kindness, and righteousness and blessing and mercy and life and peace
וְטוֹב בְּעֵינֶֽיךָ לְבָרֵךְ אֶת עַמְּךָ יִשְׂרָאֵל בְּכָל עֵת וּבְכָל שָׁעָה בִּשְׁלוֹמֶֽךָ	Vetov be'eineicha levarech et ammecha Yisra'el bechol et uvechol sha'ah bishlomecha	and may it be good in Your eyes to bless Your people Israel at all times and in every hour with Your peace.
בָּרוּךְ אַתָּה ה' הַמְבָרֵךְ אֶת עַמּוֹ יִשְׂרָאֵל בַּשָּׁלוֹם	Baruch attah ADONAI hamvarech et ammo Yisra'el bashalom	Blessed are You, Hashem, who blesses His people Israel with peace.
