= Fast of Esther =

Pre-Purim fast in Judaism

The Fast of Esther
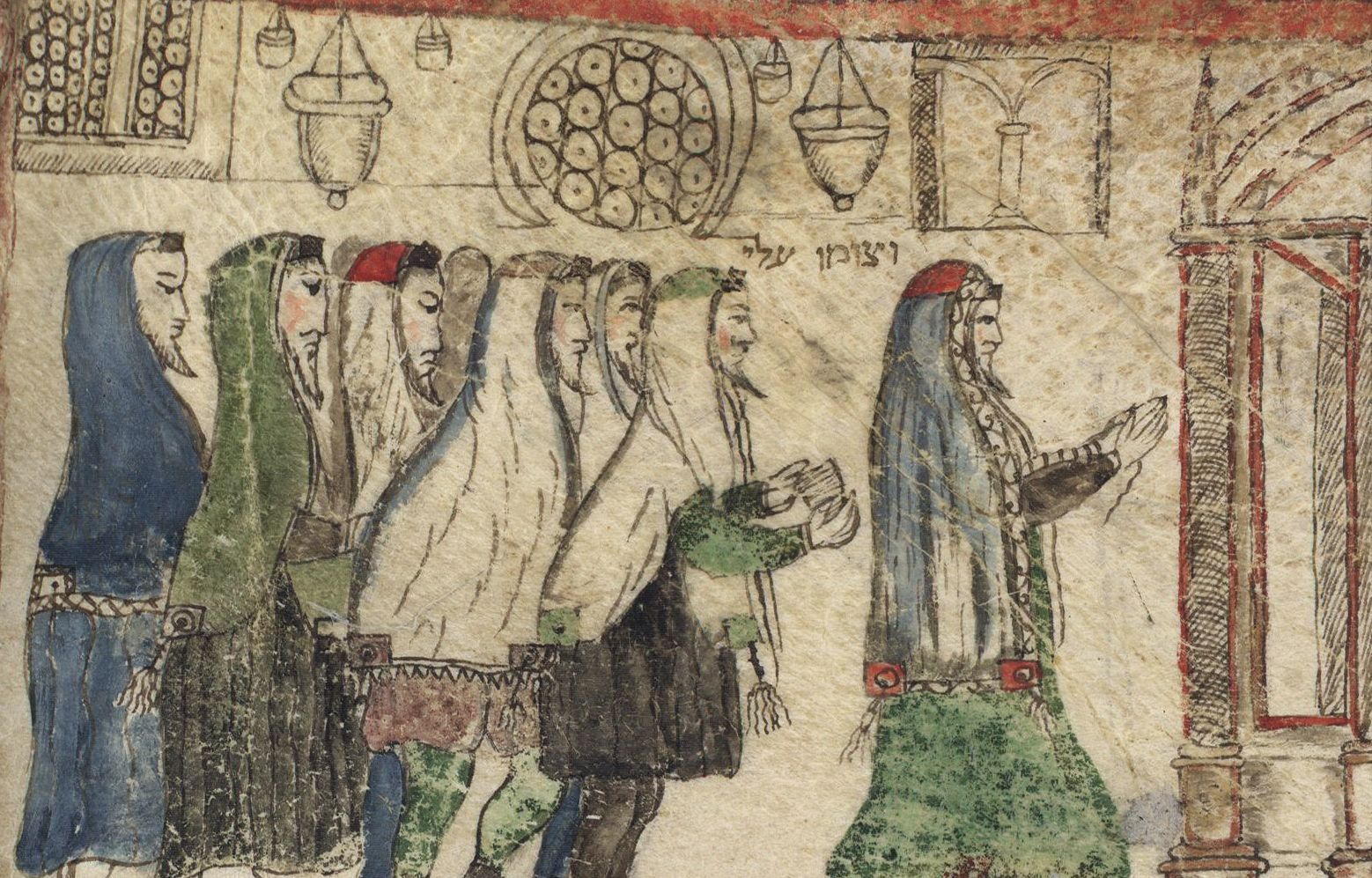
- Drawing of the Jewish people fasting and praying following Esther's request
- Official name: תַּעֲנִית אֶסְתֵּר
- Type: Jewish
- Significance: Commemorating the three-day fast observed by the Jewish people in the story of Purim
- Observances: Fasting
- Begins: 13th day of Adar at dawn (if Shabbat, then 11th day of Adar at dawn)
- Ends: The same day, at nightfall
- Date: 13 Adar
- 2025 date: March 13
- 2026 date: March 2
- 2027 date: March 22
- Related to: Purim

The Fast of Esther (Hebrew: תַּעֲנִית אֶסְתֵּר, romanized: Ta'anit Ester) is a fast in Judaism observed on the eve of Purim. Traditionally, it is said to commemorate the communal fast held by the Jewish people throughout the Achaemenid Empire on the 13th day of Adar. According to the Book of Esther, this was the date scheduled for the battle between the Jews and their antagonists, and the fast followed a tradition where Jewish communities would fast during wartime to arouse "mercy from God".

Unlike other fasts, the Fast of Esther is a Jewish custom. It is not mentioned in the Talmud, but it is mentioned in the Midrash and other later sources from the days of the Geonim. Therefore, it is considered less severe than the other fasts.

== Origins ==
It is a common misconception that this fast dates back to Esther's time. The book of Esther 9:31 recounts, "They had established for themselves and their descendants the matters of the fasts and their cry", but according to most commentators this refers instead to the fasts mentioned in the book of Zechariah 8:19.

The 13th of Adar, on which the fast falls, was first observed as Nicanor Day (יום נקנור). The holiday celebrated the defeat of Seleucid general Nicanor in the Maccabean Revolt but ceased to be observed by the Geonic period.

The first mention of the Fast of Esther is as a minhag that is referenced in the Geonic period.

The medieval scholar, Rabbeinu Tam, interprets the Talmudic passage, "The thirteenth of Adar is a time of assembly for all" as a pre-Geonic reference to the fast, although this interpretation is not unanimous. A 2010 study examines the origin of the fast and the reason for its arising in the Geonic period.

Another misconception is that the fast commemorates the three day fast described in the Book of Esther, as a result of the decree that had been instigated by Haman, the king's royal vizier, an antisemitic enemy of the Jews from the Amalekite nation.

Mordecai entreated Esther to use her position as Queen to beg Ahasuerus to annul the decree. Before approaching the king unbidden at risk of her life, Esther asked Mordecai to arrange that the Jews of Shushan should hold a three-day fast:

Go, gather together all the Jews that are present in Shushan, and fast ye for me, and neither eat nor drink three days, night or day; I also and my maidens will fast in like manner; and so will I go in unto the king, which is not according to the law; and if I perish, I perish.

Although there is a source for three commemorative fasts, held after Purim, to recall this three day fast, and they are sometimes referred to as "the Fast of Esther", there is no association between those fasts and the Fast of Esther on the 13th of Adar.

== Laws and customs ==
The fast is from dawn to nightfall. Usually, one should not eat or drink after the fast until one has heard the evening Megillah, though if one is weak, one may have a snack.

The fast is observed on the 13th day of the Hebrew month of Adar (when the year has two Adars, it is observed only in the second Adar). If the date of the Fast of Esther falls on Shabbat, the fast is instead observed on the preceding Thursday. As the Fast of Esther is not one of the four public fasts ordained in the Tanakh, the laws concerning its observance are more lenient: pregnant people, nursing people, and those with illnesses precluding fasting are not required to observe it.

== Fasting in the Book of Esther ==
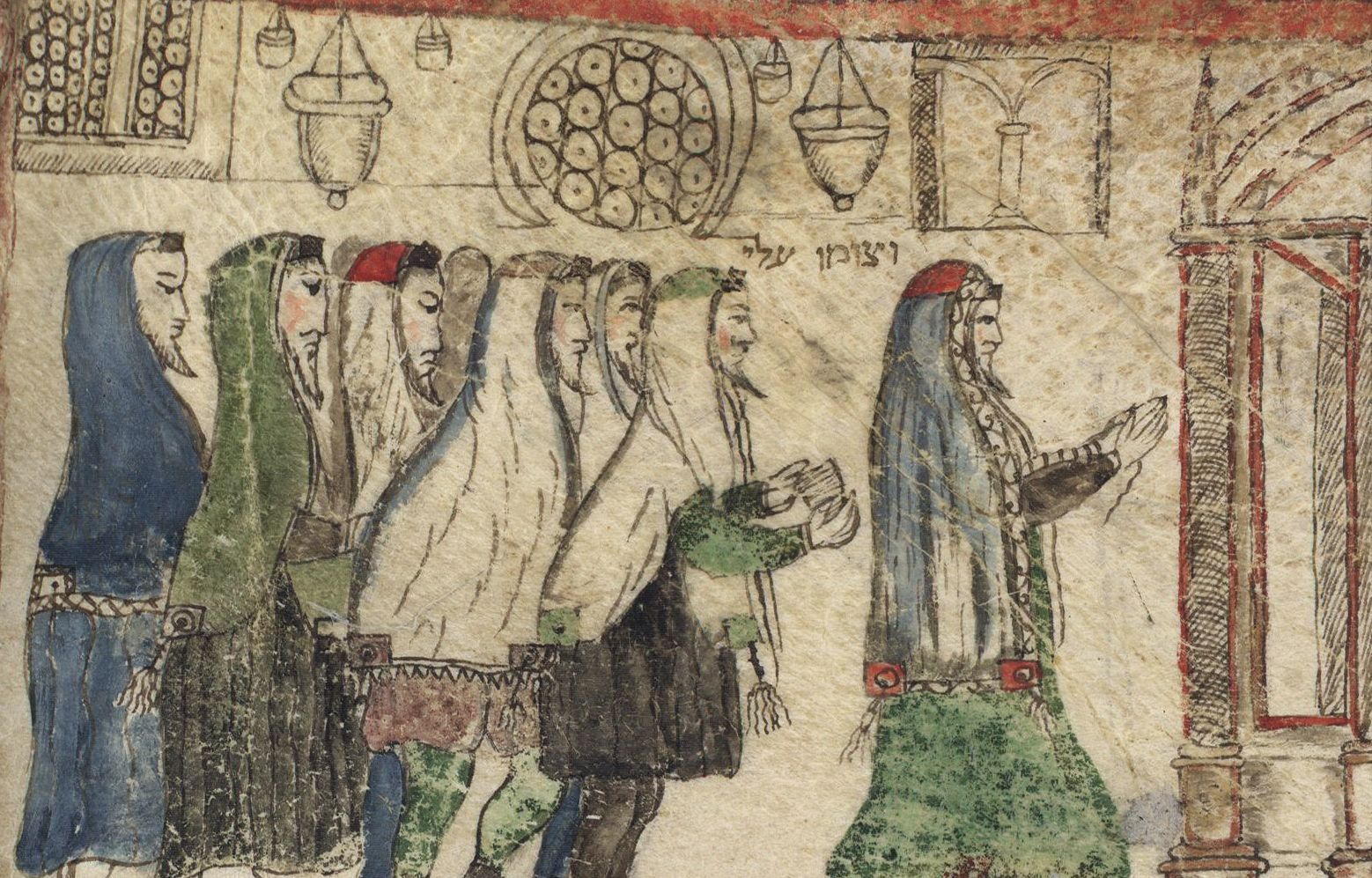
Illustration of the Jews following Esther's instruction to fast, with text וצומו עלי wə-tsūmū ‘ālay, "and fast for me", from Esther 4:16. (Mosheh ben Avraham Peshkarol, Ferrara, 1617)

It is generally accepted in the rabbinic tradition that the original three-day "Fast of Esther" mentioned in chapter 4 of Book of Esther occurred on the 14th, 15th, and 16th days of Nisan, these being the eve and first two days of Passover. While halacha usually forbids fasting on Passover, it is believed that Esther reasoned it would be better to fast on one Pesach lest they all be destroyed and thus never be able to observe the holiday in the future. Some commemorate this three day fast by fasting on three intermittent days during Adar. It is moved from Nisan due to Nisan being a month of redemption.

The 13th of Adar was a fast day for the warriors while going out to battle, as it had been customary to fast during battle to gain divine favor. Some suggest the following reason that the fast was named after Esther. Since the whole Jewish nation was at risk of annihilation and were therefore required to engage in battle, and fasting during battle is irresponsible, therefore, only Esther who was protected by the king, was justifiably able to fast. Thus, it was "her" fast.

== Date in the Gregorian calendar ==
The Gregorian calendar dates correlated with 13 Adar, from dawn until nightfall, for 2021–2026 are:

Hebrew year	Gregorian Date
5781	25 February 2021
5782	16 March 2022
5783	6 March 2023
5784	21 March 2024
5785	13 March 2025
5786	2 March 2026

== See also ==
- Amalek
- Aneinu
- Fasting in Judaism
- Haman (Bible)
- Selichot
