= Yom Kippur Katan =

Monthly Jewish penitential observance

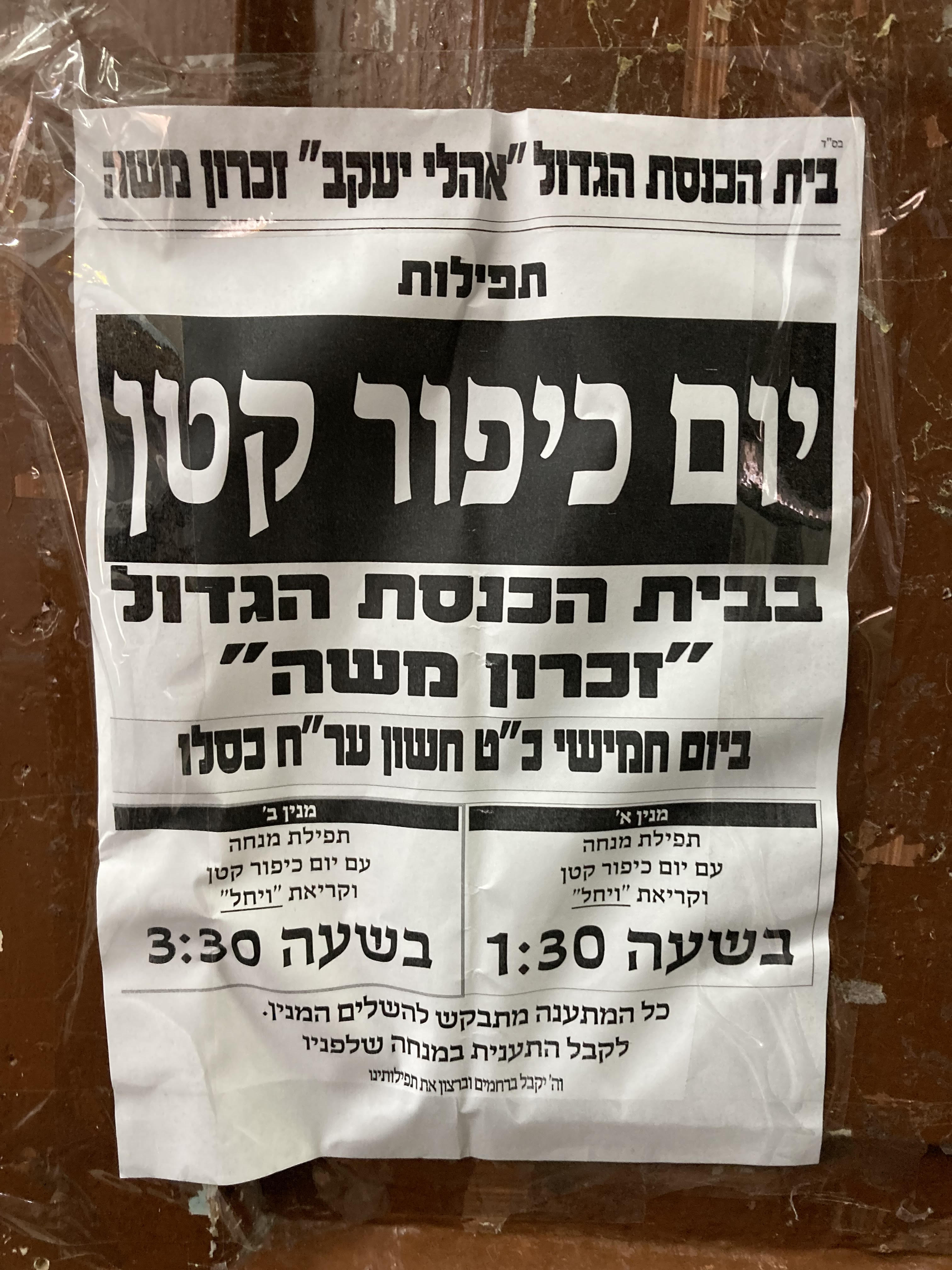
A sign announcing fast day prayers for Yom Kippur Katan in the Zichron Moshe Synagogue in Jerusalem. The special Torah reading for Mincha of a fast day, as announced on this sign, is recited only if at least ten men are fasting.

Yom Kippur Katan (Hebrew: יוֹם כִּפּוּר קָטָן, romanized: yôm kippûr qāṭān, lit. 'Small Day of Atonement') is a penitential observance in Judaism held on the eve of Rosh Chodesh (IPA: [/ʁoʃ ˈχodeʃ/]; רֹאשׁ־חֹדֶשׁ, 'head of the month'), framing the transition into a new month as an opportunity for confession, supplication, and moral reflection. Its theological foundation is rooted in the Torah's Rosh Chodesh sin-offering, described in Numbers 28:15 as "one goat as a purgation offering to GOD, to be offered in addition to the regular burnt offering and its libation", as well as rabbinic interpretations that assign an atoning function to the monthly offering. Since Rosh Chodesh is not designated as a fast day and fasting on this day is prohibited by halakhic authorities (פּוֹסְקִים, pōsqîm, 'deciders'), the penitential practices are observed on the preceding day (i.e., Erev Rosh Chodesh). The liturgy of Yom Kippur Katan, as maintained in traditional Ashkenazic siddurim, begins with Psalm 102 ("a prayer of the afflicted, when faint") and proceeds with seliḥot-like supplications. The waning moon and the month's conclusion are presented as symbols of diminution, accountability, and the aspiration for renewal.

== Origin ==
The custom is of comparatively recent origin and is not mentioned in the Shulchan Aruch. It appears to have been inaugurated in the sixteenth century at Safed by the kabbalist Moses ben Jacob Cordovero, who called the fast Yom Kippur Katan; it was also included by Isaac Luria in his Seder ha-Tefillah. Rabbi Isaiah Horowitz refers to it by that name, saying it should be observed by fasting and repentance: "Following the custom of the very pious, one must repent of his ways and make restitutions both in money and in personal acts, in order that he may enter the new month as pure as a new-born infant". When Rosh Chodesh occurs on Shabbat or Sunday, Yom Kippur Katan is observed on the preceding Thursday. (Note: This is the common practice today; however, opinions differ. The Ben Ish Hai (Year 2, Vayikra 4) rules that when Rosh Chodesh is on the Sabbath, one should fast on Friday; the Kaf Ha'Chaim (417:21) and Aruch HaShulchan (417:11) rule that one should fast on Thursday. The Mishnah Berurah in one place (550:11) says to fast on Thursday, but elsewhere (417:4) says that in places that recite Selichot, it should be done on Thursday. That said, in places that do not recite Selichot, they should fast on Friday. The Kaf Ha'Chaim, also in 417:21, says that if the molad falls two days before Rosh Chodesh, the fast should be held on the day of the molad, and if the moladis before midday, the fast should be observed on the day before the molad. Nevertheless, the common practice is as we wrote in the body of the article.) As fasting is prohibited on Shabbat, Rosh Chodesh, and many other Jewish holidays, the fast is moved up.

== Practices ==
Fasting is not obligatory and is only performed by the very pious. One who wishes to fast must accept the fast at the Mincha of the previous day.

A schedule of the prayers for Yom Kippur Katan and other minor fast days with at least 10 people fasting in the Ahavat Chesed synagogue in Bene Berak.

The liturgy of the day, which consists of selichot, is recited at the Mincha prayer in the afternoon. In many communities, Tallit and tefillin are worn, especially by those who are fasting. If there are among the congregation ten persons who have fasted, they read the Torah reading Vayechal (Exodus 32:11–14, 34:1–10) as on other fast days. The selichot are taken partly from the selichos of mincha from Yom Kippur, with the Viddui ha-Gadol (the great confession of sin by Rabbenu Nissim) and Ashamnu, and also a beautiful poem written for the occasion by Leon of Modena and beginning with Yom zeh. Some congregations add Avinu Malkenu. For the text of the Selichot see Baer, Avodat Yisrael, pp. 319–327; Emden's Siddur Beit Ya'aḳov, ed. Warsaw, pp. 212a–216b.

Yom Kippur Katan is not observed on the day before Rosh Hashanah. It is not observed prior to Rosh Chodesh Cheshvan because Yom Kippur has just passed. It is not observed before Rosh Chodesh Tevet, because that day is Hanukkah. It is not observed prior to Rosh Chodesh Iyar, because one may not fast during Nisan.

As stated above, if the 29th of the month falls on a Friday or a Sabbath, Yom Kippur Katan is observed on the Thursday prior.

== See also ==
- Isru chag refers to the day after each of the Three Pilgrimage Festivals.
- Chol HaMoed, the intermediate days of Passover and Sukkot.
- Mimouna, a traditional North African Jewish celebration held the day after Passover.
- Pesach Sheni, is exactly one month after 14 Nisan.
- Purim Katan is when during a Jewish leap year Purim is celebrated during Adar II so that the 14th of Adar I is then called Purim Katan.
- Shushan Purim falls on Adar 15 and is the day on which Jews in Jerusalem celebrate Purim.
- Yom tov sheni shel galuyot refers to the observance of an extra day of Jewish holidays outside of the land of Israel.
