= Mar son of Ravina =

3rd century talmudic sage

Mar son of Ravina (Aramaic: מר בריה דרבינא; Mar Breih deRavina) was a Babylonian Jewish rabbi who lived around the late third century (fourth generation of Amoraim). He was not the son of Ravina I or Ravina II (both of whom lived after him), but of a different father having the same name.

== Practices ==
The Talmud mentions Mar son of Ravina's many unique pious practices. His friend Rav Nachman bar Yitzchak described him as "fearing Heaven" due to his strict practice of the details of halacha and his aspiration to act in a way that would fulfill all halachic opinions.

A number of his practices have become accepted halacha to this day, for example:

- In situations in which one possesses a full loaf of barley bread and a slice of wheat bread, and wants to know which bread to make the Hamotzi blessing over, Mar son of Ravina's approach was to place the slice within the full loaf, and make the blessing over the slice and the full loaf simultaneously.
- With regard to the question of whether to put the right or left shoe on first, Mar son of Ravina would put the right shoe on without tying it, then the left shoe, then tie the left shoe, then tie the right shoe. This practice was accepted by the Shulchan Aruch.
- The Talmud records a special prayer which Mar son of Ravina would say at the end of the Amidah prayer. A variation of this prayer is said by all Jews today, known by its opening words Elokai netzor.
- Mar son of Ravina would let down the tefillin straps on his front side, as is done to this day. He would insert the four tzitzit strings into the corner of his garment and fold them over, forming eight strings, as is done today.
- Mar son of Ravina would fast every day of the year except Purim, Shavuot, and Erev Yom Kippur - three days on which there is a special mitzvah to eat.
- At his son's wedding, Mar son of Ravina considered the guests' celebration to be excessive, so he brought a cup worth 400 zuz and broke it before them, to cause him distress. This is the source of the current custom to break a cup at Jewish weddings while reciting Psalms 137:5–6, in memory of the destroyed Temple in Jerusalem.
- Mar son of Ravina did not permit his son to perform medical bloodletting on him, considering it a possible violation of the Biblical prohibition on a son striking or wounding his parent.
- Once he passed the city Babylon, which was already ruined at the time. Mar son of Ravina took some of its dust and threw it outside the city, to fulfill the Biblical prophecy "I shall sweep it with the broom of destruction" (Isaiah 14:23).
