= Fast of Behav =

Jewish fast day

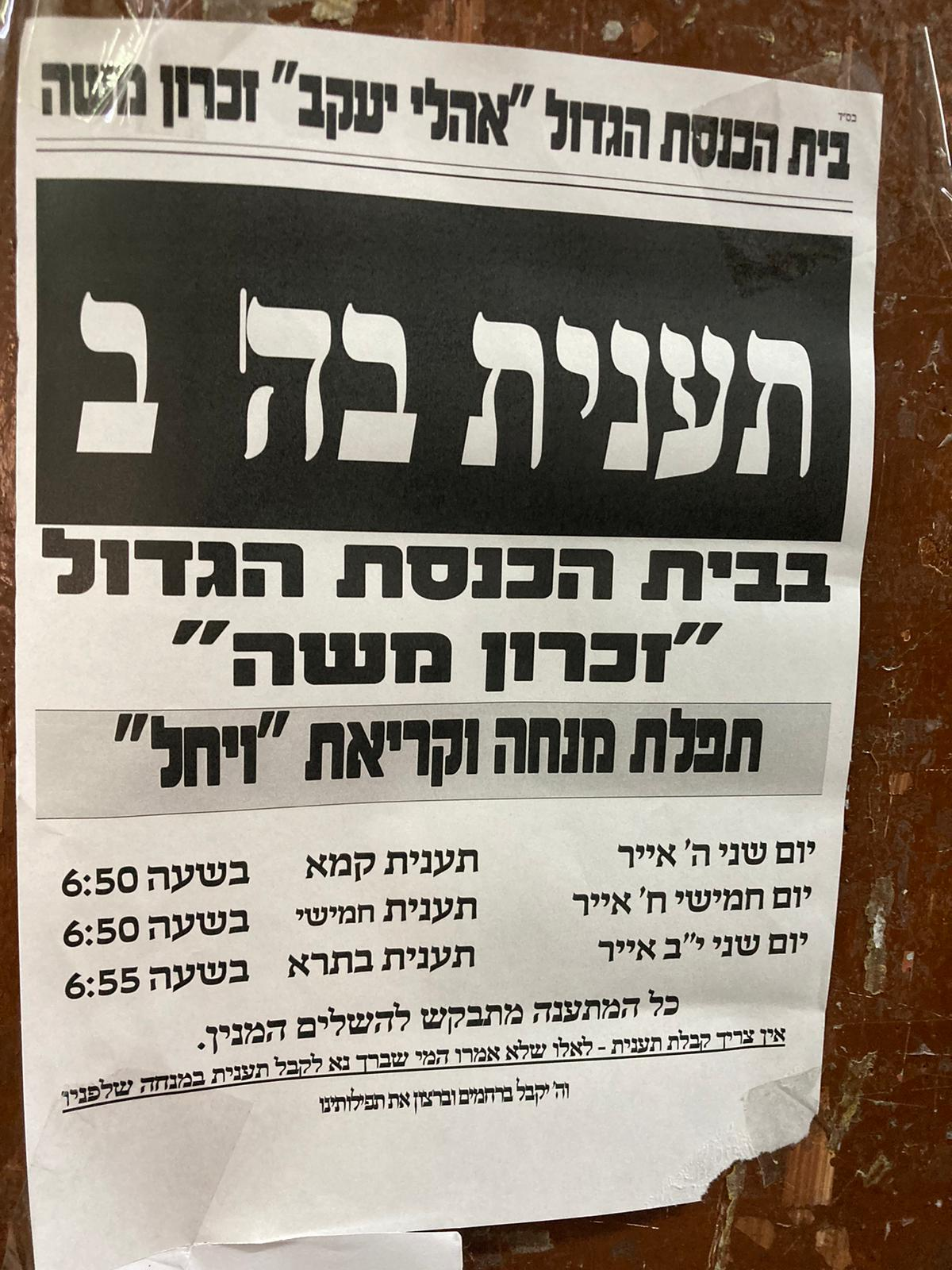
A sign announcing fast day prayers for Behav in the Zichron Moshe Synagogue in Jerusalem. The special Torah Reading for Mincha of a fast day, as announced on this sign, is done only if at least ten men are fasting.

The Fast of Behav (תענית בה"ב) refers to a tradition of Ashkenazic Jews to fast on the Monday, Thursday, and then following Monday after the holidays of Sukkot and Pesach. While today very few people fast, many Ashkenazic communities recite the Selichot for these days. Practically, the fasts are observed in the months of Cheshvan and Iyar, so as not to fast in the happy months of Tishrei and Nisan.

== Source and practices ==
The Masekhet Soferim (Chapter 21) says that there were "students" who fasted on a Monday, Thursday, and following Monday in the month of Nisan. However, it is clear that this was a private practice which was not publicized.

The Tur cites the custom of Ashkenazic and French Jewry to fast in Cheshvan and Iyar. In later generations, this custom spread to some Sephardic communities.

Some explain that the reason for the fasts is in case one sinned over the long Sukkot or Pesach holidays, and others say that it should be for an atonement before the raining and harvest seasons. The days of Monday and Thursday were chosen because they are considered days of extra mercy from Heaven.

According to the Mishnah Berurah (492:3), the fasts should always be on the first Monday, Thursday, and following Monday, following the first Sabbath after Rosh Chodesh Cheshvan and Iyar. However, some communities have the custom to delay the fasts in Cheshvan until the end of the month. Since Shavuot is only one day (or two days in the Diaspora), there is less of a concern that one sinned, and there was no widespread custom to fast after Shavuot. Nevertheless, there have been individuals who fasted on a Monday, Thursday and Monday after Shavuot.

Traditionally, on the Sabbath preceding these fasts, a special Mi Shebeirach is recited for those who intend to fast. Most communities recite this Mi Shebeirach before returning the Sefer Torah to the Ark, but some (generally Western European communities) add it as an additional line to the Mi Shebeirach recited for the community (after Yekum Purkan). One who responds "Amen" to this blessing does not need to accept the fast upon oneself at the Mincha of the proceeding day.

A schedule of the prayers for Behav and other minor fast days with at least 10 people fasting in the Ahavat Chesed synagogue in Bene Berak.

While today few people fast, there are many communities which recite the special Selichot prayers on the mornings of these fasts.
