= Ghribi =

Ghribi is a surname. Notable people with the surname include:

- Ali Ghribi (born 1974), Tunisian paralympic athlete
- Habiba Ghribi (born 1984), Tunisian middle and long-distance runner

== See also ==
- Gribi, a surname
