= Shovavim =

Part of the Hebrew calendar

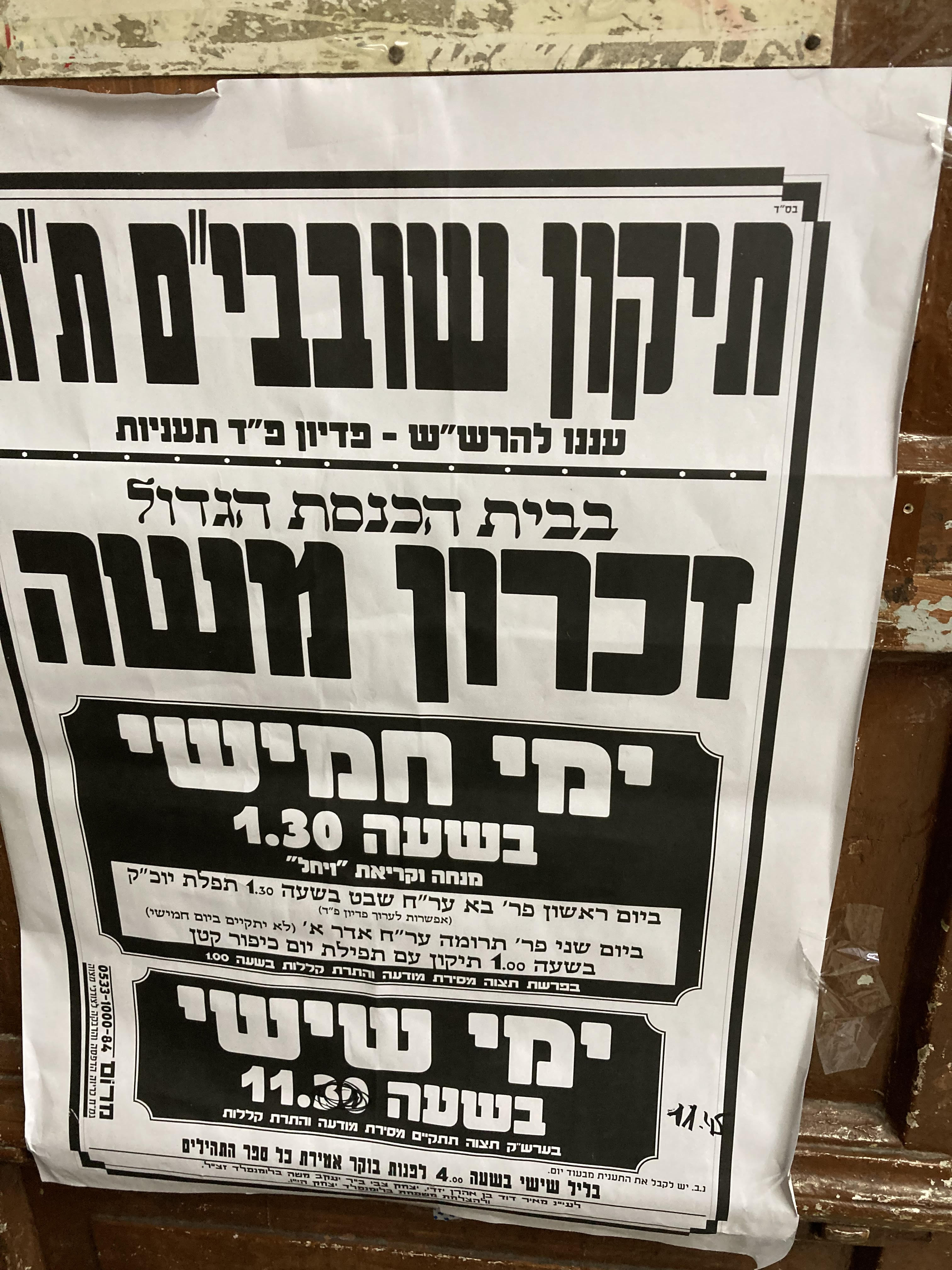
An advertisement for Shovavim, prayer featuring the ta'anit (fast) in Zikhron Moshe synagogue in Jerusalem.

Shovavim (Hebrew: שובבי״ם) is a period of six to eight weeks each year, in which some Kabbalists teach one should focus on repenting for one's sins, particularly sexual sins.

The term shovavim is a Hebrew acronym consisting of the initial letters of the parshioth (Torah portions) of "Shemot", "Va'era", "Bo", "Beshalach", "Yitro" and "Mishpatim". The period in which these portions are read typically falls around Tevet-Shevat in the Hebrew calendar (corresponding to January–February). During a Hebrew calendrical leap year, this period is extended to an eight-week sequence called "Shovavim Tat", derived by adding the next two portions, "Terumah" and "Tetzaveh", to the list.

When read as a Hebrew word, shovavim means "mischief-makers." This word appears in Jeremiah 3:22, which begins: "Return, mischief makers" (שׁוּבוּ בָּנִים שׁוֹבָבִים). The name shovavim is thus symbolic of the repentance which one is exhorted to do in this period.

== History ==
There are several early sources for the fasting eight times in a leap year; the observance in a non-leap year is much later. The earliest source for Shovevim appears in Leket Yosher, where Joseph ben Isaac (c. 1420–1488) says that his teacher, Israel Isserlein would fast on the Thursday of these weeks in a leap year. The custom of fasting in a leap year is also mentioned in Sefer Haminhagim of Isaac Tyrnau.

A schedule of the prayers for Shovavim and other minor fast days with at least 10 people fasting in the Ahavat Chesed synagogue in Bene Berak.

The early Kabbalists' practices took on a new meaning. First, they were expanded to include every year (albeit only six weeks) rather than only in a leap year. In this season, Kabbalists teach that repenting for sins ("mischief") is auspicious, especially sexually related transgressions.

During these weeks, it is customary to be more careful not to violate any of the sexually related transgressions commanded in the Torah. Some have the customs of studying laws relating to such transgressions, ta'anit (fasting), and giving extra tzedakah (charity) during this time, and of reciting Selichot and other tikkunim (Kabbalistic prayers or meditations) designed to counteract their harmful effects. On the Shabbats, when these weekly portions of the Torah are read, some take upon themselves to refrain from speaking, except words of prayer and Torah. This type of fast is called a ta'anit dibbur (תענית דבור).

Since Kabbalistic teachings popularized these customs, Sephardic and Hasidic Jews are more likely to follow them than their Ashkenazi counterparts. Nevertheless, specific very traditional Eastern Ashkenazic communities, such as Golders Green Beth Hamedrash and Viyen (amongst Viyeners that preserve the Nusach Ashkenaz) follow the original custom to recite Selichot for these days in a leap-year only, individuals in these communities may fast as well.

== Practices ==
=== Fasting ===
During the Shovavim period, some Jews have the custom to fast every Thursday - some do Monday and Thursday - from dawn until dusk. One custom is to fast only the first Monday and Thursday and the second Monday ("beit hey beit", or "BaHaB"). Some fast on Friday until Shabbat eve.

=== Prayer ===
There are extra prayers added called "Tikkun Shovavim" during these weeks. Some have the custom of praying more prayers and reading extra Psalms during this period.

=== Ta'anit Dibbur ===
Some observe a special type of fast called a ta'anit dibbur during the Shovavim period. This does not involve refraining from eating and drinking, but from speaking. During the entire day (usually Shabbat, when regular fasting is prohibited), one refrains from superfluous speech between sunrise and dusk. Speaking words of prayer and Torah is permitted. Some Jewish congregations gather on the Shabbat when these speech fasts are held, to read the Psalms three times (a total of 450 psalms). At an average pace, this reading can take up to ten hours. This is usually accomplished between the Shabbat morning meal and the afternoon prayer.
