= Chol HaMoed =

Middle days of some Jewish holidays

Halakhic texts relating to this article
- Mishneh Torah: Hilkhot Shevitat Yom Tov 6:22–24, 7, and 8
- Shulchan Aruch: Orach Chaim 530–548. The original and a user-contributed partial translation are available online.
- Other rabbinic codes: Kitzur Shulchan Aruch 104, 105, and 106

Chol HaMoed (Hebrew: חול המועד, ḥōl ha-mōʿed), a Hebrew phrase meaning "mundane of the festival", refers to the intermediate days of the week-long holidays of Passover and Sukkot. As the name implies, these days mix features of chol (mundane) and moed (festival).

On Passover, Chol HaMoed consists of the second day through to the sixth day of the holiday (the third through to the sixth in the Diaspora). On Sukkot, Chol HaMoed consists of the second day through to the seventh day (the third through to the seventh in the Diaspora).

The special mitzvahs for the entire holiday are observed during the Chol HaMoed. During Chol HaMoed Sukkot, the commandments of dwelling in a Sukkah, taking the Lulav, and reciting Hallel apply, and during Chol HaMoed Pesach, there is a prohibition on Chametz.

Although it has a unique name, Hoshanah Rabbah, the seventh day of Sukkot, is part of Chol HaMoed. This day is only on Sukkot, not on Passover. Prayer services that day combine some usual practices of Chol HaMoed with practices of both Yom Tov and the High Holy Days.

== General concepts ==
Chol HaMoed combines features of weekday (Chol) and festival (Moed).

=== Weekday (Chol) ===
Work

On weekdays during Chol HaMoed the usual restrictions that apply to the Biblical Jewish holidays are relaxed, but not eliminated. For example, work that would normally be prohibited on the festival would be allowed to prevent financial loss or if the results of the work are needed for the festival itself. Work for public need is also allowed. If one has the ability to take vacation from work without financial loss during those days, he or she is normally required to do so. Many tasks such as laundry washing, hair cutting and shaving are to be avoided except in some circumstances.

Prayers

Prayers on weekdays during Chol HaMoed are based on the weekday order of prayers, not the festival order of prayers.

=== Festival (Moed) ===
The principal customs of the respective festivals continue throughout the festival:

- Use of matzo and avoidance of products with leavening (chametz) on Passover
- Dwelling in the sukkah (every day) and use of the Four Species (except on the Sabbath) on Sukkot
- Another special addition was the Mussaf offering in the Temple in Jerusalem
- Four people, instead of the weekday three, are called to the Torah

Ya'aleh v'Yavo is added to the Amidah and Birkat HaMazon on these days. Hallel and Mussaf prayers are said on these days, as on Yom Tov, although on Chol Hamoed of Passover, an abridged form of Hallel is recited. Hoshanot are recited on Sukkot. The tachanun prayer is omitted.

On weekdays during Chol HaMoed there are four aliyot at the Torah reading in synagogue, as opposed to the standard three of weekdays, pointing to the festive nature of Chol HaMoed.

=== Tefillin ===
On weekdays during Chol HaMoed, there are various customs regarding whether tefillin should be worn, reflecting the dual nature of the day. Many streams of Ashkenazi Jews and Yemenite Jews do wear them (as on weekdays) as well as those following the non-Hasidic Lithuanian tradition. Sephardic Jews, Ashkenazi followers of the Vilna Gaon and most Chassidim, or those with Hasidic ancestry, do not (as on festivals). However, in some Hasidic communities, such as Sanz, Bobov, Sanzklausenbarg and many in Satmar, men who were never married (known as bochurim) - or in some communities until the age of eighteen when considered of marriageable age - do wear tefillin; in all Hasidic communities (with the exception of some of those who never really accepted Hasidic custom such as Erlau) married (or formerly married) men do not wear tefillin during Chol HaMoed. In the United States, and most of the Diaspora, both customs are widely seen in practice. In Israel however, the customs of the Vilna Gaon have a stronger influence, so few Jews in Israel wear tefillin on Chol HaMoed, and most of those who do only do so privately before public prayer services unless they go to a minyan that does; nevertheless, in recent years a number of "tefillin minyanim" have started in Israel.

Among those who do wear tefillin on Chol HaMoed, some omit or recite the blessings, depending on one's ancestral custom. Most of those who wear tefillin on Chol HaMoed remove the tefillin before Hallel out of respect for the festive nature of Chol HaMoed which is especially palpable during the recitation of Hallel. The exception to this practice is the third day of Passover, when the Torah reading (which follows Hallel) discusses the mitzvah of tefillin, so many only remove the tefillin after the Torah reading is completed and the Torah scroll has been returned to the Ark.

== Shabbos Chol HaMoed ==
Shabbos Chol HaMoed or Shabbat Chol HaMoed, a Sabbath that occurs during Chol HaMoed, is observed like any other Sabbath in almost every respect. In particular, the usual restrictions on work apply fully, as on any other Sabbath.

Shabbos Chol Hamoed differs from an "ordinary" Sabbath in the following ways:

Prayers:

- In most Eastern Ashkenazic communities, Kabbalat Shabbat is abbreviated. In many Western Ashkenazic and Sephardic communities, it is recited as normal.
- Ya'aleh v'Yavo (as throughout Chol HaMoed)
- Hallel (as throughout Chol HaMoed)
- According to Ashkenazi custom, reading of Song of Songs on Passover or Ecclesiastes on Sukkot
- Torah Reading: seven aliyot as usual, but the Weekly Torah portion and Haftarah are replaced by readings particular to the Festival
- Mussaf for the Festival (as throughout Chol HaMoed) replaces that for an "ordinary" Sabbath, with additions for the Sabbath
- On Sukkot: Most communities recite Hoshanot (as throughout Sukkot, but without using the Four Species nor removing Torah scrolls from the Ark); however, the practice of some of the Gaonim, and adopted by the Vilna Gaon and Chabad is not to recite Hoshanot at all on Shabbat.

Meals:

Use of matzo instead of regular bread on Passover; meals eaten in the sukkah on Sukkot.

== See also ==
- Isru chag refers to the day after each of the Three Pilgrimage Festivals.
- Mimouna, a traditional North African Jewish celebration held the day after Passover.
- Pesach Sheni, is exactly one month after 14 Nisan.
- Purim Katan is when during a Jewish leap year Purim is celebrated during Adar II so that the 14th of Adar I is then called Purim Katan.
- Shushan Purim falls on Adar 15 and is the day on which Jews in Jerusalem celebrate Purim.
- Yom Kippur Katan is a practice observed by some Jews on the day preceding each Rosh Chodesh or New-Moon Day.
- Yom tov sheni shel galuyot refers to the observance of an extra day of Jewish holidays outside of the land of Israel.
