= Aneinu =

Jewish prayer

Aneinu (Hebrew: עֲנֵנוּ, lit. '"answer us"'), also transliterated as annenu or aneynu, is a Jewish prayer added into the Chazzan's Repetition of the Shemoneh Esrei on fast days. It is also inserted into the personal Shemoneh Esrei inside of Shema Koleinu (a blessing in the Shemoneh Esrei) during the Shacharit Prayer by Sephardic Jews and during the Mincha Prayer by Ashkenazi Jews and Sephardic Jews.

== Text ==
The standard Ashkenazi Orthodox text of Aneinu is as follows:

Hebrew	English
עננו יהוה עננו ביום צום תעניתנו	Answer us God, answer us, on our fast day
כי בצרה גדולה אנחנו	Because we are in great distress
אל תפן אל רשענו ואל תסתר פניך ממנו ואל תתעלם מתחנתנו	Do not look at our wickedness and do not hide your face from us and do not ignore our supplication
היה נא קרוב לשועתנו	Be close to our cry
יהי נא חסדך לנחמנו	Let your kindness comfort us
טרם נקרא אליך עננו	Before we call out to you answer us
כדבר שנאמר והיה טרם יקראו ואני אענה עוד הם מדברים ואני אשמע	As it is said: “And it shall be that before they call I will answer, while they are still speaking I shall hear” (Isaiah 65:24)
כי אתה יהוה העונה בעת צרה פודה ומציל בכל עת צרה וצוקה	For you are God who answers in a time of distress, who redeems and saves in every time of distress and woe
The following line is omitted when Aneinu is inserted into Shema Koleinu.
ברוך אתה יהוה העונה בעת צרה	Blessed are you God, who answers in a time of distress
