= Amidah =

Principal prayer of Judaism

Halakhic texts relating to this article
- Mishnah: Berakhot 4–5
- Babylonian Talmud: Berakhot 4–5
- Mishneh Torah: Tefillah 4–5
- Shulchan Aruch: Orach Chaim 89–127

The Amidah (Hebrew: תְפִלָת הַעֲמִידָה, romanized: (Tephilāt ha-ʿAmīdā), lit. 'the Standing Prayer'), also called the Shemoneh Esreh (שְׁמוֹנֶה עֶשְׂרֵה, Sĕmōne ʿEšrē, 'Eighteen'), is an important prayer in Judaism. Orthodox Jews recite the Amidah during each of the three services prayed on weekdays: Morning (שַׁחֲרִית, Shacharit), afternoon (מִנחָה, Mincha), and evening (מַעֲרִיב, Ma'ariv; also called עַרבִית, Arvit). On Shabbat, Rosh Chodesh (ראש חודש, 'Head [of the] Month'), and Jewish holidays, after the morning Torah reading, a fourth Amidah is recited during Mussaf (מוּסָף). Once annually, a fifth Amidah is recited during the Ne'ila (נְעִילָה) service of Yom Kippur. Due to the importance of the Amidah, in the Rabbinic literature it is referred to only as "ha-tefila" (הַתְּפִילָה, 'the prayer').

A precise dating of the Amidah's formalization is not possible. However, Rabban Gamaliel is recorded in tractate Berakhot 28b:12 of the Talmud saying, "Each and every day, a person recites the prayer of eighteen blessings" (i.e., the Shemoneh Esreh), suggesting that the Amidah likely had a fixed formula before the end of the Mishnaic period (c. 220 CE). Furthermore, in Berakhot 28b:23, the Talmud records the formalization of the contemporary nineteen-blessing Amidah by the tanna Shmuel ha-Katan during the same period. Given that the Amidah includes a petition for the reconstruction of the Temple, the Second of which was destroyed in 70 CE, the Amidah's fixing likely occurred between then and the end of the Tannaitic era. Accordingly, in Judaism, to recite the Amidah is a mitzvah d'rabbanan (Jewish Babylonian Aramaic: מִצְוָה דְּרַבָּנָן, lit. 'commandment of [the] Rabbis'), or a commandment of Rabbinic origin.

Although "Shemoneh Esreh" refers to the original number of component blessings in the prayer, the typical weekday Amidah actually consists of nineteen blessings. Among other prayers, the Amidah can be found in the siddur, the traditional Jewish prayer book. The prayer is typically recited standing with feet firmly together, preferably while facing Jerusalem. During public worship in Orthodox Judaism, the Amidah is typically first prayed quietly by the congregation and then repeated aloud by the hazzan (cantor), but only if there is a minyan; it is not repeated during Ma'ariv. The repetition's original purpose was to give illiterate members of the congregation a chance to participate in the collective prayer by answering "amen". Conservative and Reform congregations sometimes abbreviate the public recitation of the Amidah according to their customs. When the Amidah is modified for specific prayers or occasions, the first three blessings and the last three remain unchanged, framing the Amidah used in each service. In comparison, the middle thirteen blessings are replaced by blessings (usually just one) specific to the occasion.

== Origin ==
There has been a general consensus that some form of the eighteen blessings of the Amidah date to the Second Temple period. In the time of the Mishnah, it was considered unnecessary to prescribe its text and content fully. This may have been simply because the language was well known to the Mishnah's authors. The Mishnah may also have not recorded specific text because of an aversion to making prayer a matter of rigor and fixed formulæ.

According to the Talmud, Rabban Gamaliel II, the first leader of the Sanhedrin after the fall of the Second Temple in 70 CE, undertook to codify uniformly the public service, directing Simeon HaPakoli to edit the blessings (probably in the order they had already acquired) and made it a duty, incumbent on everyone, to recite the prayer three times daily. Still, this does not imply that the blessings were unknown before that date; in other passages, the Amidah is traced to the "first wise men", or to the Great Assembly. In order to reconcile the various assertions of editorship, the Talmud concludes that the prayers had fallen into disuse, and that Gamaliel reinstituted them.

The Talmud indicates that when Gamaliel undertook to codify the Amidah, he directed Samuel ha-Katan to write another paragraph inveighing against informers and heretics, which was inserted as the twelfth prayer in modern sequence, making the number of blessings nineteen. Other Talmudic sources indicate, however, that this prayer was part of the original 18; and that 19 prayers came about when the 15th prayer for the restoration of Jerusalem and of the throne of David (coming of the Messiah) was split into two.

== When the Amidah is recited ==
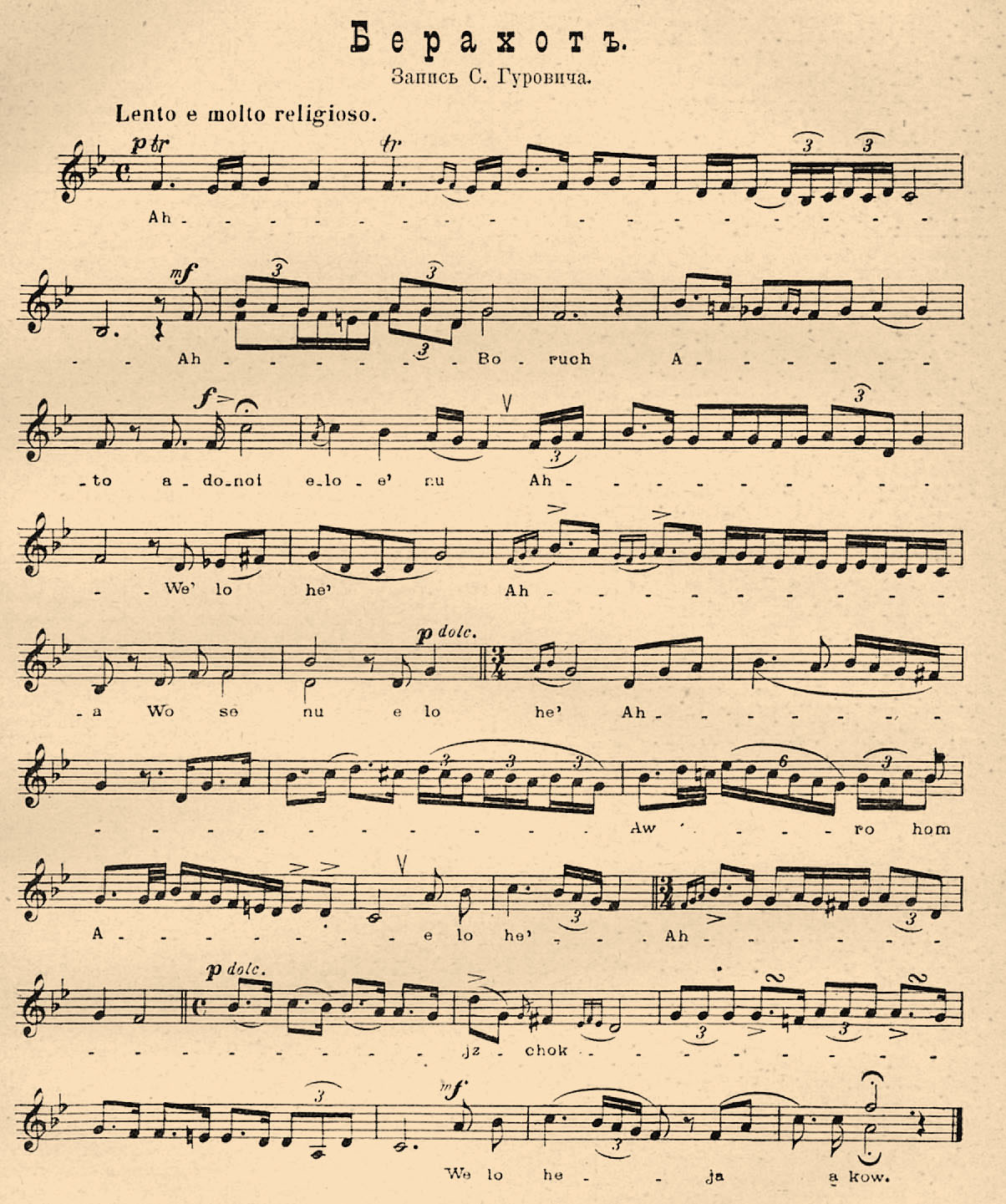
Illustration from Brockhaus and Efron Jewish Encyclopedia (1906—1913)

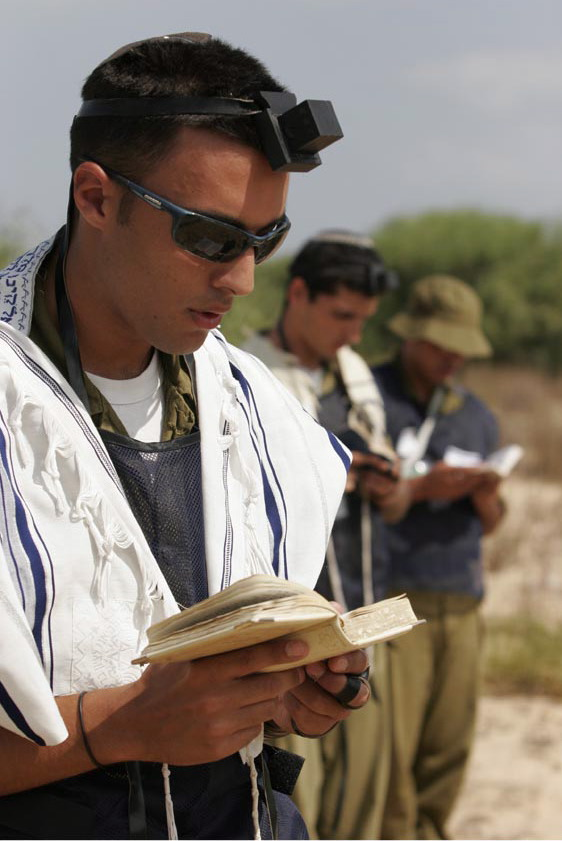
Morning Prayer, 2005.

On regular weekdays, the Amidah is prayed three times, once each during the morning, afternoon, and evening prayer services that are known respectively as Shacharit, Mincha, and Ma'ariv. One opinion in the Talmud claims, with support from Biblical verses, that the concept for each of the three services was founded respectively by each of the three biblical patriarchs. The prescribed times for reciting the Amidah thus may come from the times of the public tamid ("eternal") sacrifices that took place in the Temples in Jerusalem. After the Second Temple's destruction in 70 CE, the Council of Jamnia determined that the Amidah would substitute for the sacrifices, directly applying Hosea's dictate, "So we will render for bullocks the offering of our lips." For this reason, the Amidah should be recited during the time period in which the tamid would have been offered. Accordingly, since the Ma'ariv service was originally optional, as it replaces the overnight burning of ashes on the Temple altar rather than a specific sacrifice, Maariv's Amidah is not repeated by the hazzan (reader), while all other Amidot are repeated.

On Shabbat, Rosh Chodesh, and other Jewish holidays there is a Mussaf ("Additional") Amidah to replace the additional communal sacrifices of these days. On Yom Kippur, a fifth recitation, Ne'ilah, is added as well.

== Structure of Weekday Amidah ==
The weekday Amidah contains nineteen blessings. Each blessing ends with the signature "Blessed are you, O Lord..."; the opening blessing begins with this signature, as well.

The first three blessings as a section are known as the shevach ("praise"), and serve to inspire the worshipper and invoke God's mercy. The middle thirteen blessings compose the bakashah ("request"), with six personal requests, six communal requests, and a final request that God accept the prayers. The final three blessings, known as the hoda'ah ("gratitude"), thank God for the opportunity to serve the Lord. The shevach and hoda'ah are standard for every Amidah, with some changes on certain occasions.

=== The nineteen blessings ===
The nineteen blessings are as follows:

1. Avot ('ancestors') – praises of God as the God of the biblical patriarchs: the "God of Abraham, God of Isaac, and God of Jacob."
2. Gevurot ('powers') – praises God for his power and might. This prayer includes a mention of God's healing of the sick and resurrection of the dead. It is also called Tehiyyat ha-Metim ('resurrection of the dead'). Rain is considered a great manifestation of power, like the resurrection of the dead; hence, in winter, a line recognizing God's bestowal of rain is inserted in this blessing. Aside from Ashkenazim, most communities also insert a line recognizing dew in the summer.
3. Kedushat ha-Shem ('sanctification of the Name') – praises God's holiness. During the chazzan's repetition, a longer version of the blessing called Kedusha is chanted responsively. The Kedusha is further expanded on Shabbat and festivals.
4. Binah ('understanding') – asks God to grant wisdom and understanding to Israel.
5. Teshuvah ('return', 'repentance') – asks God to help Jews to return to Torah and praises God as a God of repentance.
6. Selichah – asks for forgiveness for all sins, and praises God as a God of forgiveness.
7. Geulah ('redemption') – asks God to rescue the people Israel. On fast days, the chazzan adds a portion called Aneinu during their repetition after concluding the Geulah blessing.
8. Refuah ('healing') – a prayer to heal the sick. The praying person can, in addition to the general request, ask for the healing of specific individuals. The phrasing uses the person's Jewish name and the name of their Jewish mother (or Sara immeinu).
9. Birkat HaShanim ('blessing for years [of good]') – asks God to bless the earth's produce. A prayer for rain is included in this blessing during the rainy season.
10. Galuyot ('diasporas') – asks God to allow the ingathering of the Jewish exiles back to the land of Israel.
11. Birkat HaDin ('justice') – asks God to restore righteous judges, as in the old days.
12. Birkat HaMinim ('sectarians', 'heretics') – asks God to destroy those in heretical sects, who slander Jews and who act as informers against Jews.
13. Tzadikim ('the righteous') – asks God to have mercy on all who trust him, and asks for support for the righteous.
14. Boneh Yerushalayim ('Builder of Jerusalem') – asks God to rebuild Jerusalem, and to restore the Kingdom of David.
15. Birkat David ('Blessing of David') – asks God to bring the descendant of King David, who will be the Messiah.
16. Tefillah ('prayer') – asks God to accept the group's prayers, to have mercy, and be compassionate. On fast days, Ashkenazi Jews insert Aneinu into this blessing during mincha. Sephardi Jews recite it during shacharit as well, and Yemenite Jews recite it also during the maariv preceding a fast day.
17. Avodah ('service') – asks God to restore the Temple and sacrificial services.
18. Hoda'ah ('thanksgiving') – thanks God for the group members' lives and souls, and for God's daily miracles. When the chazzan reaches this blessing during the repetition, the congregation recites a prayer called Modim deRabbanan ('thanksgiving of the Rabbis'). After this, Birkat Kohanim is recited either by the Kohanim present—if any—or by the chazzan during their repetition of the shacharit and mussaf Amidahs. It is also recited during mincha on fast days, during mussaf when applicable, and Neilah on Yom Kippur.
19. Sim Shalom ('grant peace') – asks God for peace, goodness, blessings, kindness, and compassion. Ashkenazim generally say a shorter version of this blessing at mincha and ma'ariv called Shalom Rav; this formula was recited in all prayers in Provence.

=== Concluding meditation ===
The custom has gradually developed of reciting, at the conclusion of the latter, the supplication with which Mar son of Ravina used to conclude his prayer:

My God, keep my tongue and my lips from speaking deceit, and to them that curse me let my soul be silent, and like dust to all. Open my heart in Your Torah, and after [in] Thy commandments let me [my soul] pursue. As for those that think evil of [against] me speedily thwart their counsel and destroy their plots. Do [this] for Thy name's sake, do this for Thy right hand's sake, do this for the sake of Thy holiness, do this for the sake of Thy Torah. That Thy beloved ones may rejoice, let Thy right hand bring on help [salvation] and answer me...

At this point, some say a biblical verse related to their name(s). For example, someone named Leah might say Psalms 3:9, since both Leah and this verse begin with the letter Lamed and end with Hay. This practice is first recorded in the 16th century, and was popularized by the Shelah.

Then Psalm 19:15 (which was the final line of Mar son of Ravina's supplication) is recited.

Three steps back are followed by a follow-up prayer:

Mainstream Ashkenazi Orthodox Judaism also adds the following prayer to the conclusion of every Amidah:

May it be your will, O my God and God of my fathers, that the Temple be rebuilt speedily in our days, and give us our portion in your Torah, and there we will worship you with reverence as in ancient days and former years. And may the Mincha offering of Judah and Jerusalem be pleasing to God, as in ancient days and former years.

Many Sephardi prayer books correspondingly add:

May it be your will, O my God and God of my fathers, that You Shall speedily rebuild the Temple in our days, and give us our portion in your Torah, so that we may fulfill your statutes and do Your Will and serve you with all our heart.

Many also customarily add individual personal prayers as part of the quiet recitation of the Amidah. Rabbi Shimon discourages praying by rote: "But rather make your prayer a request for mercy and compassion before the Omnipresent." Some authorities encourage the worshipper to say something new in his prayer every time.

=== The repetition ===
In Orthodox and Conservative (Masorti) public worship, the Amidah is first prayed quietly by the congregation; it is then repeated aloud by the chazzan (reader), except for the evening Amidah or when a minyan is not present. The congregation responds "Amen" to each blessing, and many recite "Baruch Hu Uvaruch Shemo" ("blessed is He and blessed is His Name") when the chazzan invokes God's name in the signature "Blessed are You, O Lord..." Some say that if not six minyan members respond "Amen," the chazzan's blessing is considered in vain. The original purpose of the repetition was to include individuals who did not know the prayer text in the chazzan's Amidah by answering "Amen."

==== Shortened repetition ====
The public recitation of the Amidah is sometimes abbreviated, with the first three blessings (including Kedushah) said out loud and the remainder quietly. The individual's quiet repetition of the Amidah is said afterwards, not before. This practice is commonly referred to as heikha kedusha (Yiddish: הויכע קדושה, lit. "high (loud) kedushah"), or in modern Hebrew as mincha ketzarah (Hebrew מנחה קצרה, lit. "short mincha"), or sometimes as bekol ram (Hebrew בקול רם, lit. "in a high voice"). It is occasionally performed in Orthodox prayers (in some communities, it is customary for mincha to be recited this way), and is more common in Conservative and Reform congregations. A variety of customs exist for how exactly this practice is performed.

== Manner of prayer ==
The laws concerning the Amidah are designed to focus one's concentration as one beseeches God one-on-one.

=== Concentration ===
Prayer in Judaism is called avodah shebalev ("service of the heart"). Thus, prayer is meaningful only if one focuses one's emotions and intention (kavanah) on the words of the prayers. The Shulchan Aruch thus advises that one pray using a translation one can understand (i.e., one's vernacular), but learning the meaning of the Hebrew liturgy is ideal.

Halakhah requires that the first blessing of the Amidah be said with full intention and attention; if said by rote alone, it must be repeated with intention. Moses Isserles (16th century) wrote that this is no longer necessary because "nowadays ... even in the repetition it is likely he will not have intention". The second to last blessing of Hoda'ah also prioritizes kavanah.

When the Amidah is said by oneself in the presence of others, many Jews who wear a tallit (prayer shawl) will drape the tallit over their head, allowing their field of vision to be focused only on the siddur and personal prayer.

=== Interruptions ===
Interrupting the Amidah is forbidden. The only exceptions are in cases of danger or to urgently relieve oneself. There are also halakhot to prevent interrupting the Amidah of others; for example, it is forbidden to sit next to someone praying or to walk within four amot (cubits) of someone praying.

=== Quiet prayer ===
The guideline of quiet prayer comes from Hannah's behavior when she prayed in the Temple to bear a child. She prayed "speaking upon her heart" so that no one could hear, yet her lips were moving. Therefore, when saying the Amidah, one's voice should be audible to oneself but not loud enough for others to hear.

=== Standing ===
The term "Amidah," derived from the Hebrew gerund meaning "standing," refers to the practice of reciting the prayer while standing with one's feet together. This posture is believed to mimic the appearance of angels, who, according to the biblical prophet Ezekiel, have "one straight leg." As worshippers address the Divine Presence, they must remove all material thoughts from their minds, just as angels are said to be purely spiritual beings. Similarly, the Tiferet Yisrael explains in his commentary, Boaz, that the Amidah is so-called because it helps people focus their thoughts. By nature, a person's brain is active and wandering. The Amidah brings everything into focus.

The Talmud says that one who is riding an animal or sitting in a boat (or, by modern extension, flying in an airplane) may recite the Amidah while seated, as the precarity of standing would disturb one's focus. Halakha traditionally allows individuals with illnesses or disabilities that prevent them from standing during prayer to pray while seated or, if needed, lying on their side.

=== Facing Jerusalem ===
The Amidah is preferably said facing Jerusalem, as suggested by Solomon's prayer:

Every prayer, every supplication, which any person from Your people Israel shall have, when he knows the personal affliction of his heart, he shall stretch out his hands towards this Temple.

The Talmud records the following baraita on this topic:

A blind man, or one who cannot orient himself, should direct his heart toward his Father in Heaven, as it is said, "They shall pray to the Lord" (I Kings 8). One who stands in the diaspora should face the Land of Israel, as it is said, "They shall pray to You by way of their Land" (ibid). One who stands in the Land of Israel should face Jerusalem, as it is said, "They shall pray to the Lord by way of the city" (ibid). One who stands in Jerusalem should face the Temple. ... One who stands in the Temple should face the Holy of Holies. ... One who stands in the Holy of Holies should face the Cover of the Ark. ... It is therefore found that the entire nation of Israel directs their prayers toward a single location.

While many Jews calculate the direction to Jerusalem in terms of a simple straight line on the map (rhumb line), some authorities of Halakha rule that one should instead follow a great circle route to Jerusalem, which is more direct. In practice, many synagogues do not face exactly towards Israel or Jerusalem. Sources disagree on whether or not it is necessary to calculate the direction precisely, and in any case, one should not face Jerusalem if it means turning one's back on the Torah ark.

=== Three steps ===
There are varying customs related to taking three steps backwards (and then forwards) before reciting the Amidah and after the Amidah. Before reciting the Amidah, it is customary for Ashkenazim to take three steps back and then three steps forward. The steps backward at the beginning represent withdrawing one's attention from the material world and stepping forward to approach the King of Kings symbolically. The Mekhilta notes that the significance of the three steps is based on the three barriers Moses had to pass through at Sinai before entering God's realm. The Mishnah Berurah ruled that only the steps forward are required, while the backward steps beforehand are just a prevalent custom. It is not the custom of the Sephardim to step backward or forward prior to reciting the Amidah.

Both Ashkenazi and Sephardi/Edot HaMizrach siddurim mention the practice of taking three steps back upon finishing the final meditation after the Amidah.

One takes three steps back upon finishing the final meditation after the Amidah, and then says, while bowing left, right, and forward, "He who makes peace in the heavens, may He make peace for us and all Israel, and let us say, Amen." Many have the custom to remain standing in place until immediately before the chazzan reaches the Kedusha, and then take three steps forward. The Talmud understands this as a reminder of the practice in the Temple in Jerusalem when those offering the daily sacrifices would walk backward from the altar after finishing. It also compares the practice to a student respectfully backing away from their teacher.

=== Bowing ===
The worshipper bows at four points in the Amidah: at the beginning and end of two blessings, Avot and Hoda'ah. It is the custom of the Ashkenazim that one bends the knees when saying "Blessed", then bows at "are You", and straightens while saying "O Lord". (At the beginning of Hoda'ah, one instead bows while saying the opening words "We are grateful to You" without bending the knees.) The reason for this procedure is that the Hebrew word for "blessed" (baruch) is related to "knee" (berech), and a verse in Psalm 146 states, "The Lord straightens the bent." At each of these bows, one must bend over until the vertebrae protrude from one's back; one physically unable to do so suffices by nodding the head. It is not the custom of the Sephardim to bend the knees during the Amidah.

During certain parts of the Amidah said on Rosh Hashana and Yom Kippur, including the Yom Kippur Avodah, Ashkenazi Jews traditionally go down to the floor upon their knees and make their upper body bowed over like an arch, similar to the Muslim practice of sujud. There are some variations in Ashkenazi customs as to how long one remains in this position. Some members of the Dor Daim movement also bow in this manner in their daily Amidah prayers.

== Special Amidot ==
=== Shabbat ===
On Shabbat, the middle 13 blessings of the Amidah are replaced by one, known as Kedushat haYom ("sanctity of the day"), so that each Shabbat Amidah is composed of seven blessings. The Kedushat haYom has an introductory portion, which on Sabbath is varied for each of the four services, and short concluding portion, which is constant:

Our God and God of our Ancestors! Be pleased with our rest; sanctify us with Your commandments, give us a share in Your Torah, satiate us with Your bounty, and gladden us in Your salvation. Cleanse our hearts to serve You in truth: let us inherit, O Lord our God, in love and favor, Your holy Sabbath, and may Israel, who loves Your name, rest thereon. Praised are You, O Lord, who sanctifies the Sabbath.

On Sabbath eve, after the congregation has read the Amidah quietly, the reader repeats aloud the Me'ein Sheva', or summary of the seven blessings. Although this is a repetition intended to be recited by the leader aloud, the common Ashkenazic practice (except for those who follow the Vilna Gaon) is that the congregation recites the middle part aloud, and then the leader repeats it:

Shield of the fathers by His word, who revives the dead by His command, the holy God to whom none is like; who causes His people to rest on His holy Sabbath-day, for in them He took delight to cause them to rest. Before Him we shall worship in reverence and fear. We shall render thanks to His name on every day constantly in the manner of the blessings. God of praises, Lord of peace, who sanctifies the Sabbath and blesses the seventh [day], and causes the people who are filled with Sabbath delight to rest, as a memorial of the work in the beginning of Creation.

=== Festivals ===
On festivals, like on Shabbat, the intermediate 13 blessings are replaced by a single blessing concerning "Sanctification of the Day" prayer. However, the text of this blessing differs from on Shabbat. The first section is constant on all holidays:

You have chosen us from all the nations, You have loved us and was pleased with us; You lifted us above all tongues, and sanctified us with Your commandments, and brought us, O our King, to Your service, and pronounced over us Your great and holy name.

A paragraph naming the festival and its special character follow.

If the Sabbath coincides with a festival, the festival blessing is recited, but with special additions relating to Shabbat.

=== Mussaf ===
On the Shabbat, festivals (i.e., on Yom Tov and on Chol HaMoed), and on Rosh Chodesh, a fourth Amidah prayer is recited, entitled Mussaf ("additional"). Like the Shacharit and Mincha Amidah, it is recited both quietly and repeated by the Reader.

The Mussaf Amidah begins with the same first three and concludes with the same last three blessings as the regular Amidah. In place of the 13 intermediate blessings of the daily service, a single blessing is added, relating to the holiday. (The Mussaf Amidah on Rosh Hashanah is unique in that apart from the first and last 3 blessings, it contains 3 central blessings making a total of 9.)

Historically (and currently in Orthodox services), the middle blessing focuses on the special Mussaf sacrifice that was offered in the Temple in Jerusalem, and contains a plea for the building of a Third Temple and the restoration of sacrificial worship. In modern times, some non-Orthodox movements have modified the text of Mussaf, or else omit it entirely.

=== Ne'ila ===
A fifth Amidah (in addition to Ma'ariv, Shacharit, Mussaf, and Mincha) is recited and repeated at the closing of Yom Kippur. The congregation traditionally stands during the entire repetition of this prayer, which contains a variety of confessional and supplicatory additions. In the Ashkenazi custom, it is also the only time that the Avinu Malkeinu prayer is said on Shabbat, should Yom Kippur fall on Shabbat.

=== Truncated Amidah (Havineinu) ===
The Mishnah (Brachot 4:3) and Talmud (Brachot 29a) mention the option of saying a truncated version of the Amidah, if one is in a rush or under pressure. It consists of only seven blessings - the usual first three and last three, and a middle blessing named after its first word, Havineinu.

== Seasonal changes ==
=== Prayers for rain and dew ===
Due to the importance of winter rains to agriculture in Israel, two blessings are changed in fall and winter to refer to rain.

==== Mentioning rain ====
Between the holidays of Shemini Atzeret and Passover respectively, God's "power of [providing] rain" (גבורות גשמים) is mentioned in the second blessing of the Amidah (Gevurot). This is done by inserting the phrase "משיב הרוח ומוריד הגשם" ("He [God] causes the wind to blow and the rain to fall"). The most prominent of God's powers mentioned in this blessing is the resurrection of the dead. Rain is mentioned here because God's provision of rain is considered to be as great a manifestation of His power as the resurrection.

Rain is not mentioned in spring and summer, when rain does not fall in Israel. Nevertheless, given the importance of moisture during the dry summer of Israel, many versions of the liturgy insert the phrase "מוריד הטל", "He causes the dew to fall", during every Amidah of the dry half of the year, even though the Talmud explicitly says that there is no obligation to do so.

On Shemini Atzeret and Passover, special extended prayers for rain or dew (known as Tefillat Geshem and Tefillat Tal respectively) are recited to introduce the change to the Amidah. In the Ashkenazic tradition, both prayers are recited by the Reader during the repetition of the Mussaf Amidah; however, many Nusach Ashkenaz communities in Israel have adopted the Sephardic custom to recite it before the Mussaf Amidah. In the normative contemporary Sephardic tradition, which prohibits such additions, places them before the Mussaf Amidah; the exception is that Spanish and Portuguese communities follow the older custom to recite it during the repetition. The change is made on these holidays because they are days of great joy, and because they are days of heavy attendance at public prayers. Therefore, the seasonal change in the language of the prayers is immediately and widely disseminated.

==== Requesting rain ====
A "request" or prayer for rain (שאלת גשמים) is also recited in winter, though for a shorter period. In Israel (and among the Jews of Djerba), this recitation begins on the 7th of Cheshvan. Although the Jerusalem Talmud says that after the destruction of the Temple, we should begin the recitation immediately after Sukkos, the Halachah does not follow this opinion. The 15-day delay between Shemini Atzeret and 7 Cheshvan was instituted so that visitors to the Temple in Jerusalem would be able to arrive home before prayers for rain began, as rain would interfere with their journey. Elsewhere, outside Israel, this season is defined as beginning on the 60th day after the autumnal equinox ("Tekufat Tishrei") – in the 20th and 21st century, this is usually on 4 December. In all cases, the recitation ends on Passover.

Requesting rain is done in the ninth blessing of the weekday Amidah. In Ashkenazi custom, this is done by insertion of the words "may You grant dew and rain" in this blessing. In Sephardi and Yemenite Jewish rituals, the blessing is changed more dramatically. During the dry season, the blessing has this form:

Bless us, our Father, in all the work of our hands, and bless our year with gracious, blessed, and kindly dews: be its outcome life, plenty, and peace as in the good years, for Thou, O Eternal, are good and does good and blesses the years. Blessed be Thou, O Eternal, who blesses the years.

In the rainy season, the text is changed to read:

Bless upon us, O Eternal our God, this year and all kinds of its produce for goodness, and bestow dew and rain for blessing on all the face of the earth; and make abundant the face of the world and fulfil the whole of Thy goodness. Fill our hands with Thy blessings and the richness of the gifts of Thy hands. Preserve and save this year from all evil and from all kinds of destroyers and from all sorts of punishments: and establish for it good hope and as its outcome peace. Spare it and have mercy upon it and all of its harvest and its fruits, and bless it with rains of favor, blessing, and generosity; and let its issue be life, plenty, and peace as in the blessed good years; for Thou, O Eternal, are good and does good and blesses the years. Blessed be Thou, O Eternal, who blesses the years.

=== Conclusion of Shabbat and festivals ===
At the Maariv Amidah following the conclusion of a Shabbat or Yom Tov, a paragraph beginning Atah Chonantanu ("You have granted us...") is inserted into the weekday Amidah's fourth blessing of Binah. The paragraph thanks God for the ability to separate between the holy and mundane, paraphrasing the concepts found in the Havdalah ceremony. In fact, the Talmud teaches that if this paragraph is forgotten, the Amidah need not be repeated, because Havdalah will be said later over wine. Once Atah Chonantanu is said, work prohibited on the holy day becomes permitted because the separation from the holy day has been established.

=== The Ten Days of Repentance ===
During the Ten Days of Repentance between Rosh Hashanah and Yom Kippur, additional lines are inserted in the first, second, second to last, and last blessings of all Amidot. These lines invoke God's mercy and pray for inscription in the Book of Life. In many communities, when the chazzan reaches these lines during his repetition, he pauses and the congregation recites the lines before him; in other communities, the congregation recites the additions only in the last two blessings, but not in the first two. During the final recitation of the Amidah on Yom Kippur the prayer is slightly modified to read "seal us" in the book of life, rather than "write us".

Moreover, the signatures of two blessings are changed to reflect the days' heightened recognition of God's sovereignty. In the third blessing, the signature "Blessed are You, O Lord, the Holy God" is replaced with "Blessed are You, O Lord, the Holy King". On weekdays, the signature of the eleventh blessing is changed from "Blessed are You, O Lord, King who loves justice and judgement" to "Blessed are You, O Lord, the King of judgement". In many Ashkenazic communities, it is also customary to conclude the last Blessing "Blessed are You, O Lord, who makes peace" instead of "Blessed are You, O Lord, who blesses His people with peace".

=== Fast days ===
On public fast days, special prayers for mercy are added to the Amidah. There are three customs as to at which prayers individuals recite the text of Aneinu without its signature in the blessing of Shomea Tefillah:

- According to the Yemenite custom (based on the custom of the Gaonim), it is recited at Shacharit and Mincha of the fast, as well as at Maariv on the night proceeding the fast.
- According to the Sephardic custom, it is recited at Shacharit and Mincha; and on Tisha Bav, when the fast begins at night, it is also recited in Maariv (effectively making this the same as the previous custom when it comes to Tisha Bav).
- According to the Ashkenazic custom, it is recited by individuals only at Mincha.

In all customs, the chazzan adds Aneinu as additional blessing in his repetition right after the blessing of Geulah, known by its first word Aneinu ("Answer us") in both Shacharit and Mincha. The blessing concludes with the signature "Blessed are You, O Lord, Who responds [some say: to His nation Israel] in time of trouble." In addition, according to the original custom, Selichot are recited in the middle of the blessing for forgiveness during the Chazzan's repetition.

At mincha, Ashkenazic communities that say the "Shalom Rav" version of the Shalom blessing at Minchah and Maariv say the "Sim Shalom" at this Minchah. The chazzan also says the priestly blessing before Shalom as he would at Shacharit, unlike the usual weekday Minchah when the priestly blessing is not said at Mincha; in many communities where the Kohanim recite Birkat Kohanim daily, this is recited now as well, particularly if Mincha is recited later in the day.

On Tisha B'Av a paragraph that begins Nachem ("Console...") is added to the conclusion of the blessing Boneh Yerushalayim ("Who builds Jerusalem") during the Amidah (for Ashkenazim, only at the Mincha service). The modified blessing opens "Lord our God, console the mourners of Zion and the mourners of Jerusalem and the city that is bereaved, destroyed, scorned and desolate". The conclusion of the blessing is revised to "Blessed are You, O Lord, Who consoles Zion and builds Jerusalem." Various Modern Orthodox and Conservative rabbis have proposed amending Nachem, as its wording no longer reflects the existence of a rebuilt Jerusalem under Israeli sovereignty after the Six-Day War. Chief Rabbi Shlomo Goren issued a revised wording of the prayer that eliminated references to Jerusalem's desolation. Other proposals to modify wording into the past tense have not been widely adopted.

=== Ya'aleh VeYavo ===
On Chol HaMoed and Rosh Chodesh, the prayer Ya'aleh Veyavo ("May [our remembrance] rise and be seen...") is inserted in the blessing of Avodah. Ya'aleh Veyavo is also said in the Kedushat HaYom blessing of the Festival Amidah, and at Birkat HaMazon. One phrase of the prayer varies according to the day's holiday, mentioning it by name. Often, the first line is uttered aloud so that others will be reminded of the change.

=== Al HaNissim ===
On Hanukkah and Purim, the weekday or sabbath Amidot are recited, but a special paragraph is inserted into the blessing of Hoda'ah. Each holiday's paragraph recounts the historical background of that holiday, thanking God for his salvation. Both paragraphs are prefaced by the same opening line, "[We thank You] for the miraculous deeds (Al HaNissim) and for the redemption and for the mighty deeds and the saving acts wrought by You, as well as for the wars which You waged for our ancestors in ancient days at this season."

=== Modern changes ===
The text of the Amidah was changed by the Hassidic movement in the 18th century. They attempted to fit the Ashkenazic liturgy with the rulings of the 16th century Kabbalist Isaac Luria, commonly known by the Hebrew abbreviation Ha'Ari The Ari formulated a text that was adapted from the Sepharadi text in accordance with his understanding of Kabbalah, and the Chasidim adapted Nusach Ashkenaz to fit with his rulings, making what became known as Nusach Sefard.

Following the Israeli Declaration of Independence in 1948, some Orthodox authorities proposed changes to the special Nachem 'Console' prayer, commemorating the Siege of Jerusalem (70 CE) and the establishment of Aelia Capitolina. This is added to the Amidah on Tisha B'Av in light of these events.

Conservative and Reform Judaism have altered the text to varying degrees to align it with their views of modern needs and sensibilities. Conservative Judaism retains the traditional number and time periods during which the Amidah must be said, while omitting explicit supplications for restoration of the sacrificial offerings described and commanded in the Torah. Reconstructionist and Reform Judaism, consistent with their views that the rhythm of the ancient sacrifices should no longer drive modern Jewish prayer, often omit some of the Amidah prayers, such as the Mussaf, omit temporal requirements and references to the Temple and its sacrifices.

Reform Judaism has changed the first blessing, traditionally invoking the phrase "God of our Fathers, God of Abraham, God of Isaac and God of Jacob", one of the Biblical names of God. New editions of the Reform siddur explicitly say avoteinu v'imoteinu "our fathers and our mothers", and Reform and some Conservative congregations amend the second invocation to "God of Abraham, God of Isaac and God of Jacob; God of Sarah, God of Rebekah, God of Leah, and God of Rachel". The new reform prayer book, Mishkan T'filah, reverses the names of Leah and Rachel. Some feminist Jews have added the names of Bilhah and Zilpah, since they were mothers to four tribes of Israel.

Liberal branches of Judaism make some additional changes to the opening blessing. The phrase umeivi go'eil 'and brings a redeemer' is changed in Reform Judaism to umeivi ge'ulah 'who brings redemption', replacing the personal messiah with a Messianic Age. The phrase m'chayei hameitim 'who causes the dead to come to life' is replaced in the Reform and Reconstructionist siddurim with m'chayei hakol 'who gives life to all' and m'chayei kol chai 'who gives life to all life', respectively. This represents a turn away from the traditional article of faith that God will resurrect the dead.

Prayer 17 (Avodah) asks God to build a Third Temple and restore qorban (animal sacrifice) and the other services performed there. The concluding meditation ends with an additional prayer for the restoration of Temple worship. Both prayers have been modified in the Conservative Judaism siddur so that, while they still ask for the restoration of the Temple, they omit the explicit plea for the resumption of sacrifices. (Some Conservative congregations remove the concluding quiet prayer for the Temple entirely.) The Reform siddur also modifies this prayer by eliminating all reference to the Temple service and replacing the request for the restoration of the Temple with: "God who is near to all who call upon you, turn to your servants and be gracious to us; pour your spirit upon us."

Many Reform congregations will often conclude with either Sim Shalom or Shalom Rav. Once either of those prayers are chanted or sung, many congregations proceed to a variation on the Mi Shebeirach (typically the version popularized by Debbie Friedman), the traditional prayer for healing, followed by silent prayer, and then a resumption of the service.

Conservative Judaism is divided over the role of the Mussaf Amidah. More traditional Conservative congregations recite a prayer similar to the Mussaf prayer in Orthodox services except that they refer to Temple sacrifices only in the past tense and do not include a prayer for the restoration of the sacrifices. More liberal Conservative congregations omit references to the Temple sacrifices entirely. Reconstructionist and Reform congregations generally do not do the Mussaf Amidah at all; if they do, they omit all references to Temple worship.

== Within the early Christian Church ==
New Testament scholar Paul Barnett has identified 2 Corinthians 1:3–7 as a modified version of the first blessing (Avot). This has also been identified by Martin Hengel in his book The Pre-Christian Paul, arguing that Saul/Paul was a teacher in the Hellenistic synagogues of Jerusalem prior to his conversion to Christianity.

== See also ==
- Siddur
- Zion and Jerusalem in Jewish prayer and ritual
