= Rosh Chodesh =

Hebrew month

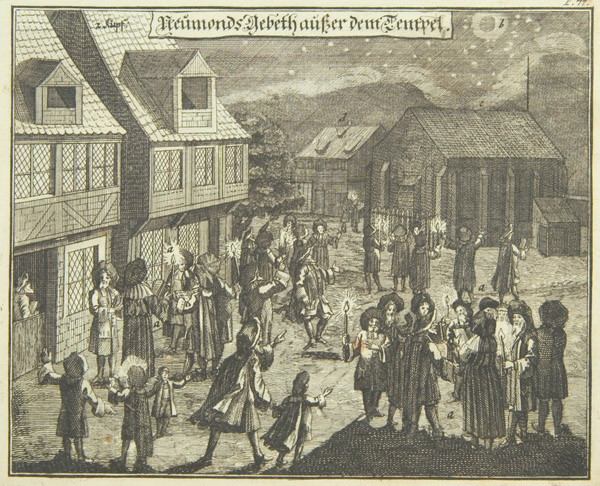
- Kiddush levana depicted in Jüdisches Ceremoniel (1724)

Halakhic texts relating to this article
- Torah: Exodus 12:1–2
- Babylonian Talmud: Megillah 22b

In Judaism, Rosh Chodesh or Rosh Hodesh (pronounced [/ʁoʃ ˈχo.deʃ/]; Hebrew: רֹאשׁ חֹדֶשׁ, romanized: rōʾš ḥōḏeš, lit. 'Head [of] the month') is a minor holiday observed at the beginning of every month in the Hebrew calendar, marked by the birth of a new moon. Rosh Chodesh is observed for either one or two days, depending on whether the previous month contained 29 or 30 days.

== Origin ==
The Book of Exodus establishes the new moon of Nisan, which is the first month of Aviv, as the beginning of the Hebrew calendar:

And the LORD spoke unto Moses and Aaron in the land of Egypt, saying: "This month shall mark for you the beginning of the months; it shall be the first of the months of the year for you."

— Exodus 12:1-2

In the Book of Numbers, God speaks of the celebration of the new moon to Moses:

And on your joyous occasions—your fixed festivals and new moon days—you shall sound the trumpets over your burnt offerings and your sacrifices of well-being.

— Numbers 10:10

In Psalm 81:4, both new and full moon are mentioned as a time of recognition by the Hebrews:

Blow the horn on the new moon, on the full moon for our feast day.

In the Hebrew Bible, Rosh Chodesh is often referred to simply as "Chodesh", as the Hebrew word "chodesh" can mean both "month" and "new month".

== Declaring the month ==
Judaism uses a lunisolar calendar, so Rosh Chodesh is celebrated in connection with the date of the new moon. Originally, the date of Rosh Chodesh was confirmed on the testimony of witnesses observing the new moon, a procedure known as kiddush hachodesh (sanctification of the month). After the Sanhedrin declared Rosh Chodesh for either a full (30-day) or defective (29-day) month, news of it would then be communicated throughout Israel and the diaspora.

This system was dependent on the functioning of the Sanhedrin to declare the month, and to communicate this month to far-flung Jewish communities. In the 4th century CE, this became impossible and instead a fixed calendar of 29- and 30-day months (see Hebrew calendar for details) was instituted by Hillel II. At the end of a 29-day month, Rosh Chodesh is celebrated for one day, on the first day of the new month. At the end of a 30-day month, Rosh Chodesh is celebrated for two days - the 30th day of the previous month, and the first day of the new month.

== Observance ==
=== Announcement ===
Despite the existence of a fixed calendar, Rosh Chodesh is still announced in synagogues on the preceding Shabbat (called Shabbat Mevarchim, the Shabbat of Blessing the new month). The announcement is made after the reading of the sefer Torah, before returning it to the Torah ark. The name of the new month, and the day of the week on which it falls, is given during the prayer. Some communities customarily precede the prayer by an announcement of the exact date and time of the new moon, referred to as the molad, or "birth". Rosh Chodesh Tishrei (which is also Rosh Hashanah) is never announced, although according to the fixed Jewish calendar, it is the determining factor for all of the postponements (Dehioth) which determine when each Rosh Chodesh is actually observed.

=== Traditional observances ===
On Rosh Chodesh, the prayer Yaaleh V'Yavo is added to the Ritzeh (or "Avodah") blessing of the Amidah. In the morning service "half Hallel" (Psalms 113–118, with two paragraphs omitted) is recited (except on Rosh Chodesh Tevet, which is during Chanukkah, when the full Hallel is recited). The Torah is read, specifically Numbers 28:1–15 which includes the sacrifices of Rosh Chodesh. An additional prayer service, called Mussaf, is added to commemorate the Rosh Chodesh sacrifices in the Temple. Its middle blessing begins "Roshei Chadashim". After the service, many recite Psalm 104.

If Rosh Chodesh falls on Shabbat, the regular Torah reading is supplemented with a reading of Numbers 28:9-15. The German custom is to sing the Half Kaddish preceding Maftir to a special tune. In most months (if it does not coincide with another special Haftarah), the regular Haftarah is replaced by a special Rosh Chodesh Haftarah. The Mussaf prayer is also modified when Rosh Chodesh falls on Shabbat. The central benediction is replaced with an alternative version (Ata Yatzarta) that mentions both the Shabbat and Rosh Chodesh. If Rosh Chodesh falls on a Sunday and not on the Sabbath, the special Haftarah of Mahar Chodesh ("Tomorrow is the New Moon", I Samuel 20:18-42) is read if it does not coincide with another special Haftarah.

Kiddush Levanah is recited soon after Rosh Chodesh, although most communities wait until three or seven days after the Molad (the time of the "birth" of the new moon). It is common to wait until Saturday night to recite Kiddush Levanah.

Many have a custom to eat a special meal in honor of Rosh Chodesh, as recommended by the Shulchan Aruch. This gives one the opportunity to recite the Ya'a'le Ve-Yavo in Birkat Hamazon. Some Hasidic Jews sing Psalm 104 during this meal.

=== Work ===
Jews nowadays generally treat Rosh Chodesh as barely different from any other weekday (except for expansion of the prayer service). The Torah does not prohibit work (melacha) on Rosh Chodesh, and the Talmud states that work is permitted on Rosh Chodesh. The Jerusalem Talmud states that women refrain from work on Rosh Hodesh, but only by custom as opposed to law. This custom is recorded in the Shulchan Aruch, but does not seem to be commonly practised in modern times.

Yet for much of early Jewish history, Rosh Chodesh was observed much more seriously. In some Biblical sources, Rosh Hodesh is described as a day when business is not conducted and which seems to have been devoted to worship and feasting. This is corroborated by an inscription from the Arad ostraca (c. 600 BCE) in which a military commander is told to deliver goods on the first of the month, but only to record this delivery in writing on the second of the month (seemingly because writing was considered a forbidden melakha). In the Second Temple period, too, Rosh Chodesh was considered a day of rest according to some sources. In the Talmudic period, one passage considered Rosh Chodesh to be a day on which work ceased (bittul); another passage suggests that work ceased (bittul) but was not forbidden (assur). To explain the current acceptance of working on Rosh Chodesh, Shaagat Aryeh proposed that there indeed was a general prohibition on Rosh Chodesh work while the Temple stood, as the mussaf sacrifice was offered on behalf of the entire people, and a general principle exists that a person may not work on a day when their sacrifice is offered.

=== Rosh Chodesh and women ===
According to the Talmud, women do not engage in work on Rosh Chodesh. Rashi, in commenting on this passage, delineates the activities from which they must refrain: spinning, weaving, and sewing—the skills that women contributed to the building of the Mishkan (Tabernacle). The Shulchan Aruch writes that "Those women whose custom is not to do work on [Rosh Chodesh] have a good custom".

The midrash Pirke De-Rabbi Eliezer gives a historical explanation for this practice:

Aaron argued with himself, saying: "If I say to Israel, 'Give ye to me gold and silver,' they will bring it immediately; but behold I will say to them, 'Give ye to me the earrings of your wives and of your sons,' and forthwith the matter will fail," as it is said, "And Aaron said to them, 'Break off the golden rings.'" The women heard (this), but they were unwilling to give their earrings to their husbands; but they said to them: "Ye desire to make a graven image of a molten image without any power in it to deliver." The Holy One, blessed be He, gave the women their reward in this world and the world to come. What reward did He give them in this world? That they should observe the new moons more stringently than the men, and what reward will He give them in the world to come? They are destined to be renewed like the new moons, as it is said: "Who satisfieth thy years with good things; so that thy youth is renewed like the eagle."

In modern times, female-centered Rosh Chodesh observances vary from group to group, but many are centered on small gatherings of women, called Rosh Chodesh groups. There is often a particular interest in the Shekinah, considered by the kabbalah to be a feminine aspect of God. These groups engage in a wide variety of activities that center around issues important to Jewish women, depending on the preference of the group's members. Many Rosh Chodesh groups explore spirituality, religious education, ritual, health issues, music, chanting, art, and/or cooking. Some groups also choose to educate young Jewish women in their community about sexuality, self-image, and other women's mental and physical health issues.

Miriam's cup (for the prophet Miriam) originated in the 1980s in a Boston Rosh Chodesh group; it was invented by Stephanie Loo, who filled it with mayim hayim (living waters) and used it in a feminist ceremony of guided meditation. Some seders (including the original Women's Seder, but not limited to women-only seders) now set Miriam's cup as well as the traditional cup for the prophet Elijah, sometimes accompanied by a ritual to honor Miriam. Miriam's cup is linked to the midrash of Miriam's well, which "is a rabbinic legend that tells of a miraculous well that accompanied the Israelites during their 40 years in the desert at the Exodus from Egypt".

== See also ==
- Judaism
- Hebrew calendar
- Solar year
- Lunar cycle
- Jewish feminism
- Yom Kippur Katan - Fast day including Confessional ritual for the day preceding Rosh Chodesh
