= Ten Days of Repentance =

Jewish holy days

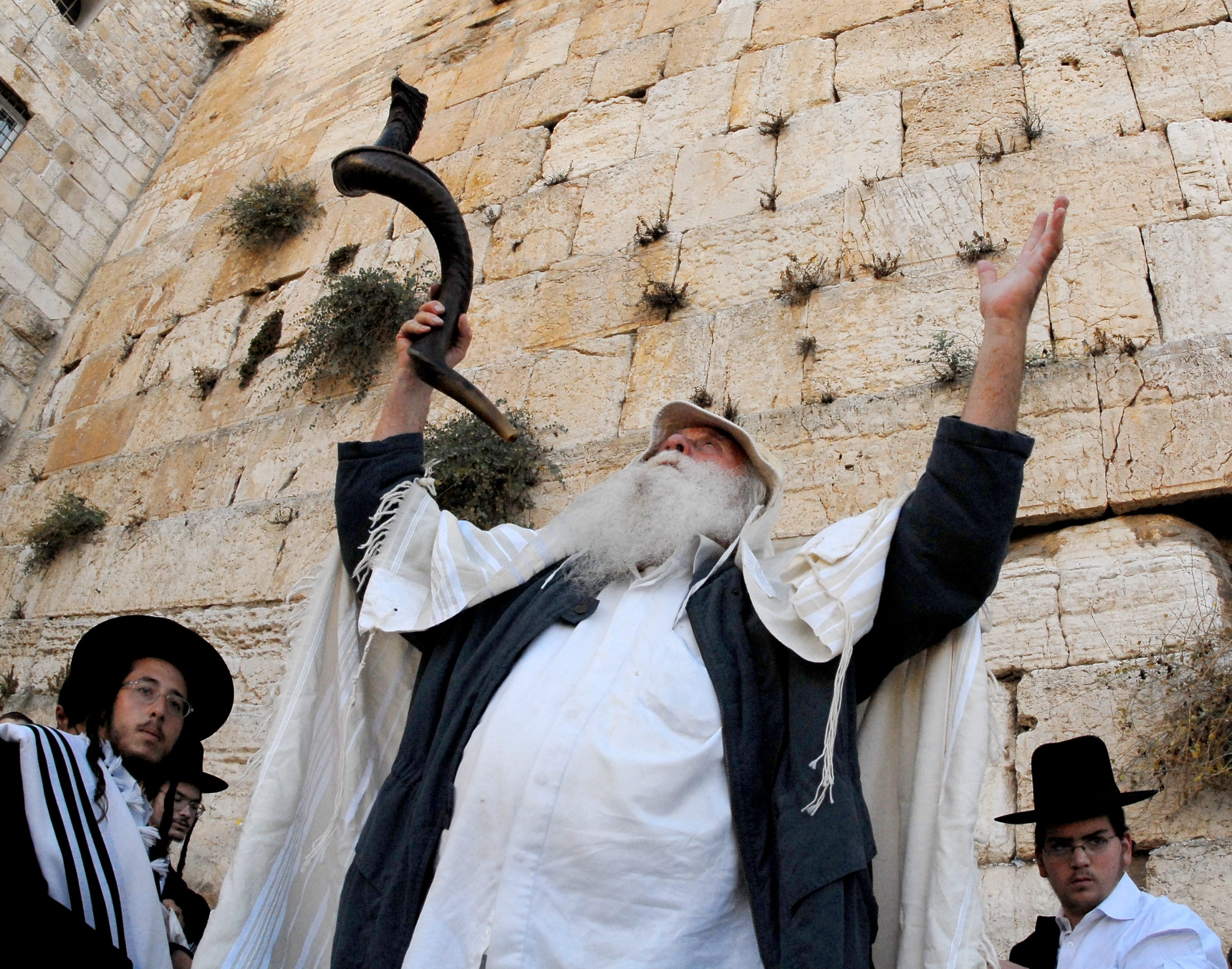
A man holding a shofar while saying selichot at the Western Wall during the Ten Days of Repentance

The Ten Days of Repentance (Hebrew: עֲשֶׂרֶת יְמֵי תְּשׁוּבָה, romanized: ʿăseret yəmēy təšūvā) in Judaism form the ten-day period of the Hebrew calendar from Rosh HaShanah—the first day of Tishrei—through Yom Kippur that, according to Rabbinic tradition, is a concentrated season for teshuvah (תְּשׁוּבָה, təshûvāh, 'repentance'), tefillah (תְּפִלָּה, tĕp̄lillāh, 'prayer'), tzedakah (צְדָקָה, ṣĕdāqāh, 'righteousness', 'charity'), and ethical hiddush (חִדּוּשׁ, ḥiddûš, 'renewal') during which God's judgment is written and sealed for every individual. The Ten Days usually fall between September and early October on the Gregorian calendar.

== Name ==
The term "Ten Days of Repentance" appears in such early sources as the Jerusalem Talmud, the Pesikta Rabbati, and the writings of the Geonim, and has been the predominant title since the period of the Rishonim. The Babylonian Talmud uses a different expression - "the ten days between Rosh HaShanah and Yom HaKippurim" - while among Geonim we also find "the ten days from the beginning of Tishrei to Yom HaKippurim", "the first ten days of the month of Tishrei", and "(the time) between Rosh HaShanah and Yom HaKippurim".

== Significance ==
During this time it is considered appropriate for Jews to practice repentance (Hebrew: תשובה, teshuvah, literally: "returning"), meaning examining one's ways, engaging in repentance and improving one's ways in anticipation of Yom Kippur. This repentance may be expressed as early morning penitentiary prayers (known as selichot), giving of charity, acts of kindness, self-reflection, or extra zehirut (spiritual vigilance).

The period is described as a special one in the Talmud:

"Seek Hashem when He is to be found" (Isaiah 55:6) - these are the days between Rosh Hashanah and Yom Kippur.

Maimonides provides a fuller description:

Even though repentance and calling out [to God] are desirable at all times, during the ten days between Rosh HaShanah and Yom Kippur, they are even more desirable and will be accepted immediately as [Isaiah 55:6] states: "Seek God when He is to be found".

Accordingly, throughout the entire year, a person should always look at himself as equally balanced between merit and sin and the world as equally balanced between merit and sin. If he performs one sin, he tips his balance and that of the entire world to the side of guilt and brings destruction upon himself. [On the other hand,] if he performs one mitzvah, he tips his balance and that of the entire world to the side of merit and brings deliverance and salvation to himself and others. This is implied by [Proverbs 10:25] "A righteous man is the foundation of the world," i.e., he who acted righteously, tipped the balance of the entire world to merit and saved it. For these reasons, it is customary for all of Israel to give profusely to charity, perform many good deeds, and be occupied with mitzvot from Rosh HaShanah until Yom Kippur to a greater extent than during the remainder of the year. During these ten days, the custom is for everyone to rise [while it is still] night and pray in the synagogues with heart-rending words of supplication until daybreak.

According to Nahmanides, "on Rosh Hashana He [God] sits on the throne as a true judge, and afterwards in the Ten Days of Repentance He pardons the crime of His servants".

== The days ==
The first two days of the Ten Days of Repentance are Rosh Hashanah.

The third day is Fast of Gedalia (except when Rosh Hashanah occurs on Thursday and Friday, in which case the Fast of Gedalia is postponed until Sunday).

Of the seven days between Rosh Hashana and Yom Kippur, one is always Shabbat. This Shabbat is known as Shabbat Shuvah ("Sabbath [of] Return"), based on the Haftarah read after the weekly Torah portion from Hosea 14:2–10, which starts with the word "Shuva" literally meaning "Return!", thus playing into the theme of the Ten Days. Alternatively it is known as Shabbat Teshuvah, due to the same theme.

The tenth and last day is Yom Kippur. Rosh Hashana and Yom Kippur together constitute the High Holy Days.

== Observances ==
The Unetanneh Tokef prayer, recited by Ashkenazim and Italian-rite Jews on Rosh Hashanah and by Eastern Ashkenazim and Italian-rite Jews on Yom Kippur, declares that "Repentance, Prayer and Charity remove the evil decree." In many editions of the Rosh Hashanah and Yom Kippur machzor (holiday prayer book), these words are crowned in smaller type with the words [respectively] fast, voice, charity to suggest that repentance includes fasting, prayer recited in a loud voice, and donations to charity. As fasting is not generally done on Rosh Hashanah, and money cannot be handled on either of the holidays, these practices are often performed during the Ten Days of Repentance, between the holidays.

=== Prayers ===
A number of changes are made to the daily prayers in this period (besides the additional changes made on Rosh Hashana and Yom Kippur):

1. The conclusions of two blessings in the Amidah prayer are modified to emphasize the theme of Divine kingship. In the third blessing, "the Holy God" is replaced with "the Holy King". In the eighth blessing, "King who loves righteousness and judgment" is replaced with "the King of Judgment" (lit. "the King, the Judgment").
2. Additional insertions are customarily made in the first two and last two blessings of the Amidah. In the first (after "for the sake of His Name in love"): "Remember us for life, King who delights in life; and inscribe us in the book of life, for Your sake, living God"; in the second (after "make salvation to grow"): "Who is like You, merciful Father, remembering His creatures in mercy for life"; in the second-to-last, near the end: "And inscribe for life (all) the sons of Your covenant"; in the last: "May we be remembered and inscribed before You in the book of life, of blessing, of peace, and of good sustenance." In the final service of Yom Kippur (Neilah), "seal" is said instead of "inscribe". In the Ashkenazi Jews' ritual, at the close of the last benediction, the words "who blesseth his people Israel with peace" are shortened into "the Maker of Peace," a close that was recited throughout the year in the Land of Israel in the times of the Geonim.
3. The prayer entitled "Avinu Malkeinu" (Our Father, our King) is said in the morning and afternoon services. In the Ashkenazic rite, it is omitted on Shabbat, Friday afternoon, and the 9th of Tishrei (which is a sort of semi-holy day, and on which tachanun is also omitted, except when Yom Kippur falls on the Sabbath, when most Ashkenazic communities recite it on the morning of the ninth of Tishrei), while some non-Ashkenazic communities recite it even on Shabbat.
4. On weekdays Selichot are recited, either at night after midnight, or before the morning prayer. The poetical pieces, at least in the Ashkenazi ritual, differ for each of the days. In the Eastern Ashkenazic rite, those for Erev Yom Kippur are the fewest and shortest, whereas in the Western Ashkenazic rite they are the longest. Indeed, the recitation of Selichot begins before the Ten Days of Repentance; in the Ashkenazic tradition, they begin after the Sabbath immediately proceeding Rosh Hashanah (or on the Sabbath before that if Rosh Hashanah falls on a Monday or Tuesday), and in the Sephardic tradition they begin immediately after Rosh Chodesh Elul.

=== Fasting ===
There is an old custom to fast all weekdays of the Ten Days of Repentance (except for the eve of Yom Kippur when fasting is forbidden) and there were those who had the custom to fast during the day on Rosh Hashanah. Nevertheless, the common custom today is to fast only on Fast of Gedalia (from dawn to dusk) and for the full day of Yom Kippur.

=== Additional customs ===
During these days some are stricter and eat only baked goods produced with a Jew involved in the baking process (a practice known as Pat Yisrael), even if during the year they eat any baked goods made in by a business from kosher ingredients (known as pat paltar). If while traveling it is not possible to obtain Pat Yisrael, then being stricter is not a requirement.

There are conflicting customs whether weddings should be held during the weekdays of the Ten Days: There is no prohibition of holding a wedding during this period, but some Orthodox Jews have a custom to avoid doing so.

Some Jews and communities perform the Kapparot custom, typically on the day before Yom Kippur.
