= High Holy Days =

Jewish holiday period

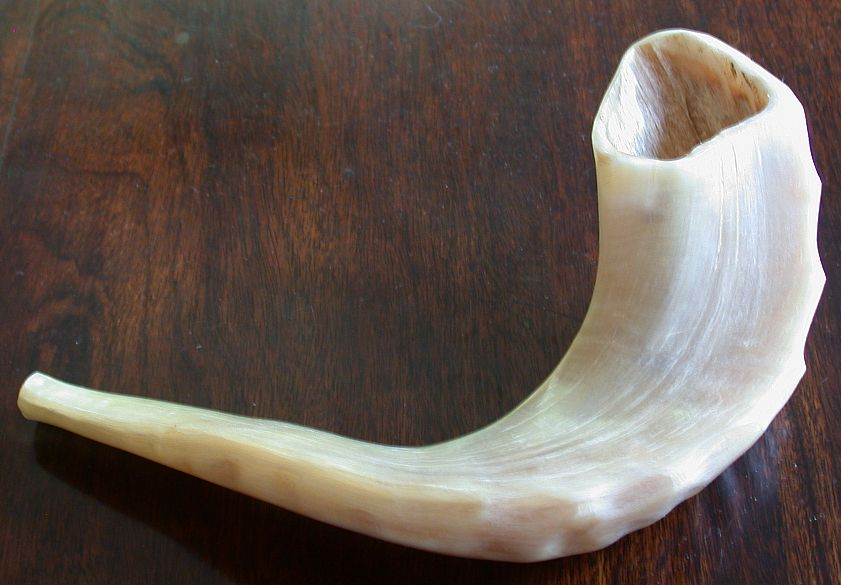
Ashkenazi-style shofar. The shofar is used during the High Holy Days.

The High Holy Days (also known as the High Holidays or as the Days of Awe in Hebrew: יָמִים נוֹרָאִים, Yamim Nora'im) is a term used in Judaism to refer to the holiest and most solemn period of the Jewish year, which occurs during the Hebrew month of Tishrei (spanning September to October).

Strictly defined, the High Holy Days consist of the Jewish holidays of Rosh Hashanah (the Jewish New Year) and Yom Kippur (the Day of Atonement). By extension, the term is frequently used to describe the entire ten-day period encompassing both holidays, known as the Ten Days of Repentance. The High Holy Days are also sometimes considered to extend through the autumn festival season of Sukkot, Shemini Atzeret, and Simchat Torah.

This period is traditionally preceded by a month of spiritual preparation and introspection during the Hebrew month of Elul.

== History and etymology ==
The term High Holy Days most probably derives from the popular English phrase, "high days and holy days". The Hebrew equivalent, "Yamim Noraim" (Hebrew: ימים נוראים), is neither Biblical nor Talmudic. Professor Ismar Elbogen avers that it was a medieval usage, reflecting a change in the mood of Rosh Hashanah from a predominantly joyous celebration to a more subdued day that was a response to a period of persecution.

Earlier versions of the ritual observances can be traced to the Second Temple Period and sources such as Philo, the Mishnah and the Tosefta in 100-300 CE, with the modern liturgy's relative standardization dating to the time of the Geonim and roughly in place by the Middle Ages.

== The days preceding Rosh Hashanah (Jewish new year) ==
The Hebrew month preceding Rosh Hashanah, Elul, is designated as a month of introspection and repentance. In preparation for the Jewish New Year, special prayers are recited. In many communities, Psalms 27 is added at the end of morning and evening prayers. The shofar (ram's horn) is blown at the end of morning services on weekdays, and in some communities in the afternoon service as well (it is omitted on the eve of Rosh Hashanah in order to differentiate between the customary blasts of the month of Elul and the obligatory blasts of Rosh Hashanah, and in some communities it is omitted for the 3 days proceeding Rosh Hashanah). Among Sephardi Jews, selichot are recited at dawn on weekdays throughout the month. Also, many complete the entire Psalms twice during the month. It is customary to increase the giving of tzedakah (charity) and to ask forgiveness from people one may have wronged.

At midnight on the Saturday night or Sunday morning before Rosh Hashanah (or one week before that, if the first day of Rosh Hashanah is Monday or Tuesday), Ashkenazi Jews begin reciting selichot. On the following days, however, they generally recite the selichot before the regular morning prayers. On the eve of Rosh Hashanah, extra prayers are recited and many fast until noon.

== Rosh Hashanah ==
Rosh Hashanah (Hebrew: ראש השנה "Beginning of the Year") is the Jewish New Year, and falls on the first and second days of the Jewish month of Tishrei (September/October). The Mishnah, the core work of the Jewish Oral Torah, sets this day aside as the new year for calculating calendar years and sabbatical and jubilee years.

Rabbinic literature describes this day as a day of judgment. God is sometimes referred to as the "Ancient of Days." Some descriptions depict God as sitting upon a throne, while books containing the deeds of all humanity are opened before Him.

Prayer services are longer than on a regular shabbat or other Jewish holidays, and include (on weekdays) the blowing of the shofar. On the afternoon of the first (or the second, if the first was Saturday) day, the ritual tashlikh is performed, in which sins are "cast" into open water, such as a river, sea, or lake.

== The Ten Days of Repentance ==
The "ten days of repentance" or "the days of awe" include Rosh Hashanah, Yom Kippur and the days in between, during which time Jews should meditate on the subject of the holidays and ask for forgiveness from anyone they have wronged. They include the Fast of Gedalia, on the third day of Tishrei, and Shabbat Shuvah, which is the Shabbat between Rosh Hashanah and Yom Kippur.

Shabbat Shuvah has a special Haftarah that begins Shuvah Yisrael (come back, oh Israel), hence the name of that Shabbat. Traditionally the rabbi gives a long sermon on that day.

It is held that, while judgment on each person is pronounced on Rosh Hashanah, it is not made absolute until Yom Kippur. The Ten Days are therefore an opportunity to mend one's ways in order to alter the judgment in one's favor.

== Yom Kippur ==
Yom Kippur (Hebrew: יום כפור, romanized: yom kippūr, lit. 'Day of Atonement') is the holiest day of the Jewish year. The Hebrew Bible calls the day Yom Hakippurim "Day of the Atonement/s".

In the Hebrew calendar, the ninth day of Tishrei is known as Erev Yom Kippur (Yom Kippur eve). Yom Kippur itself begins around sunset on that day and continues into the next day until nightfall, and therefore lasts about 25 hours.

Observant Jews will fast throughout Yom Kippur and many attend synagogue for most of the day. There are five prayer services, one in the evening (sometimes known as "Kol Nidre" from one of the main prayers) and four consecutively on the day. On Yom Kippur day, Ne'ilah, a prayer only recited on this day, is said. It symbolizes the closing of the gates of heaven as the day of repentance comes to an end. It provides one last chance to seek forgiveness and offer prayers before the conclusion of the holiday.

== Hoshana Rabbah ==
The seventh day of Sukkot is known as Hoshana Rabbah. Jews take bouquets of willow branches that represent their sins and bash them on the floor while saying a special prayer to God to forgive them for the sins that may have been missed on Yom Kippur.

== High Holy Days seats ==
Generally, throughout most of the year, Jewish worship services are open to all, regardless of affiliation, and membership or payment of any fee is not a requirement in order to attend. However, the High Holy Days are usually peak attendance days for synagogues and temples, often filling or over-filling synagogues. For this reason many synagogues issue tickets for attendance and may charge for them: practice varies on whether paid-up synagogue members must also buy these or whether it is included in the subscription.

Synagogues never pass a collection plate during most holiday services as some churches do, as Jews are forbidden to touch money on Shabbat or other holidays such as Rosh Hashanah and Yom Kippur. However, promises to make donations are allowed. Among synagogues in the United States, donations are often sought during the Kol Nidre service, called the "Kol Nidre Appeal," often via a pledge card, where the amount of the donation is represented by a paper tab that can be bent down in the amount of donation desired. Some temples provide a card listing donation amounts, and a paper clip which the congregant may put on the card indicating their preferred donation amount. In both cases, the card is stored inside an envelope with the congregant's name and other personal contact details, and the temple reaches them after the High Holidays are over. Rabbis and other temple representatives say that holiday ticket sales represent a significant source of revenue.

== See also ==
- Jewish holidays
- Shofar blowing
