= Isru chag =

Day after the three major jewish holidays

Isru Chag
- Official name: Hebrew: אסרו חג
- Type: Jewish
- Significance: Follows each of the Three Pilgrimage Festivals. It serves to bridge the respective holidays for the rest of the year.
- Observances: Minor: Most omit tachanun from shacharit and mincha, and some partake of extra food and drink.
- Begins: The night immediately following the Three Pilgrimage Festivals
- Ends: At nightfall of the day following the Three Pilgrimage Festivals

Isru Chag (Hebrew: אסרו חג, lit. 'Bind [the] Festival') refers to the day after each of the Three Pilgrimage Festivals in Judaism: Passover, Shavuot and Sukkot.

The phrase originates from the verse in Psalms 118:27, which states, "Bind the festival offering with cords to the corners of the altar." According to the Talmud:

With regard to anyone who establishes an addition [issur] to the Festival on the day after the Festival by eating and drinking, the verse ascribes him credit as though he built an altar and sacrificed an offering upon it, as it is stated: “Add [isru] to the Festival with fattened animals [ba’avotim] until the horns of the altar.”

In a responsum to a community that had inquired as to the rationale behind the observance of Isru Chag, Yosef Hayyim (1832–1909) cited Isaac Luria (1534–1572), the founder of Lurianic Kabbalah, to the effect that Jews connect the day after the holiday to the holiday itself due to the remaining “light” of the holiday: in other words, so that the sanctity of the holiday will be extended.

== Rabbinic authorities cite observances ==
Adding a degree of festivity to the day as a practice has further been codified in Ashkenazic communities, as Moses Isserles (1520–1572) has stated in his glosses on the Shulchan Aruch in the section Orach Chayim:

And we have the custom to eat and drink a little more on the day after the holiday – and that is the day known as "bind the festival."

— Orach Chaim 429:2

Yisrael Meir Kagan (1838–1933) ruled that the minhag (custom) is to generally forbid fasting on Isru Chag, except in instances when as a result of great distress the community synagogue decrees it.

Almost all communities omit tachanun (additional prayers of supplication) on Isru Chag. However, communities that follow the rulings of Maimonides (1135–1204), such as the Dor Daim (a movement founded in 19th century Yemen), maintain that the only days on which Tachanun is to be omitted are Shabbat, Jewish holidays, Rosh HaShanah, Rosh Chodesh, Hanukkah, Purim, and the mincha on the eve of any Shabbat and holiday.

== See also ==
- Chol HaMoed, the intermediate days of Passover and Sukkot.
- Mimouna, a traditional North African Jewish celebration held the day after Passover.
- Pesach Sheni, is exactly one month after 14 Nisan.
- Purim Katan is when during a Jewish leap year Purim is celebrated during Adar II so that the 14th of Adar I is then called Purim Katan.
- Shushan Purim falls on Adar 15, the day Jews in Jerusalem celebrate Purim.
- Yom Kippur Katan is a practice observed by some Jews on the day preceding each Rosh Chodesh or New Moon Day.
- "Yom tov sheni shel galuyot" refers to the observance of an extra day of Jewish holidays outside of the land of Israel.
