= Afternoon prayer =

Afternoon prayer may refer to:

- Asr, the daily Islamic prayer offered in the late afternoon
- Dhuhr, the daily Islamic afternoon prayer (offered earlier than Asr)
- Mincha, the daily Jewish afternoon prayer
- Tzidkatcha, the weekly Jewish afternoon prayer (recited on Shabbat)
- None (liturgy), the daily Christian afternoon prayer
