= Ashrei =

Daily prayer in Judaism

Ashrei (Hebrew: אַשְׁרֵי, lit. 'happy [is]') is a Jewish prayer recited at least three times daily in Judaism: twice during Shacharit (the morning service) and once during Mincha (the afternoon service). The prayer is composed primarily of the entirety of Psalm 145, with Psalm 84:5 and Psalm 144:15 appended to the beginning and Psalm 115:18 to the end, respectively. The first two verses added both begin with the Hebrew word ashrei, which lends the prayer its name.

In Berakhot 4b:16, Rabbi Elazar, citing Rabbi Avina, is recorded teaching that "anyone who recites Tehillah l'David (תְּהִלָּה לְדָוִד, '[a] Praise [to God] of David') three times every day is assured of a place in the World-to-Come". The Tehillah l'David referred to is Psalm 145; the Rabbis—at least as they were recorded teaching in the Talmud—did not refer to the Ashrei of Rabbinic Judaism as Ashrei.

== Times of recitation ==
Ashrei is recited three times daily during the full course of Jewish prayers, in accordance with the Talmudic statement that one who recites Ashrei three times daily is guaranteed a place in the World to Come. For this reason, not only is Ashrei recited these three times, but many of its verses occur throughout liturgy.

Ashrei is recited twice during Shacharit (once during Pesukei D'Zimrah and once between Tachanun/Torah reading and Psalm 20/Uva Letzion or in this place when any of these are omitted), and once as the introduction to Mincha; it is also recited in many customs at the commencement of Selichot services. On Yom Kippur, Ashkenazi Jews recite it during Ne'ila instead of during Mincha, whereas Sephardim and Italkim recite it during both Mincha and Ne'ila.

== Text ==
Hebrew Wikisource has original text related to this article: אשרי יושבי ביתך

The majority of Ashrei is Psalm 145 in full. Psalm 145 is an alphabetic acrostic of 21 verses, each starting with a different letter of the Hebrew alphabet arranged alphabetically. This makes Ashrei easy to memorize. The only Hebrew letter that does not begin a verse of Psalm 145 is nun (נ). This omission is discussed at greater length in the Wikipedia article on Psalm 145. Although the Septuagint and some other non-Massoretic versions of the Bible have such a line, no Jewish prayerbook inserts a line beginning with nun.

The first two verses are from Psalms 84:4-5 and Psalms 144:15 respectively. The final verse is Psalm 115:18. The Rome liturgy adds to this Psalm 119:1 and Machzor Vitry (12th century) adds four (possibly five) other verses beginning with the same word ("Ashrei") (namely Psalms 119:1-2, 84:6, 112:1, and 89:16), and it appears that originally the general practice was to have more introductory verses than the two now used by Ashkenazic and Sephardic Jews.

It is customary for the congregants to be seated while reciting Ashrei, as the introductory verse, "Happy are the people who dwell in Your house", describes the congregants as part of the household, not strangers or mere visitors, so they sit to demonstrate that connection. The word ישב, here translated as "dwell", also means "sit down" (as in Exodus 17:12, I Kings 2:12, and Psalm 122:5).

Verse 7 (ז): It has been noticed that, while the majority of Hebrew Bibles spell the first word of this verse with a long vowel - זֵכֶר (zaykher), many prayerbooks print this word with a short vowel - זֶכֶר (zekher) -- the two variants being described as "five dots" and "six dots" respectively. There is no difference in meaning, both variants mean the same thing, a "remembrance" or a "reminder", and both occur elsewhere in the Hebrew Bible, although the long vowel form occurs more often.

The short vowel (six dots) reading does appear in this verse in several important early editions of the Hebrew Bible, such as the first four editions of the complete Hebrew Bible, and the Complutensian Polyglot and the First Rabbinic Bible (by Pratensis). But the long vowel (five dots) reading is found in virtually all the more recent and more authoritative editions, including the Aleppo Codex, the Leningrad Codex, the Second Rabbinic Bible (by Ben-Hayyim), the Letteris edition, the Ginsburg editions, the Koren edition, the Biblia Hebraica Stuttgartensia, etc. Siddurim that carry the short vowel reading include, among others, the widely used ArtScroll Siddur (although the ArtScroll editions of the Bible and of the Psalms have here the long vowel reading). It would appear that prayerbook quotations of the Bible are sometimes copied as they appeared in earlier prayerbooks, without doublechecking the Bible itself (a similar effect has been noticed in the 19th and 20th century editions of the Anglican Book of Common Prayer, which perpetuated quotations from the Bishops' Bible instead of using the wording of the King James Version).

Verse 16 (פ). "You open Your hand ..." This is a most important verse and the universal practice is that it must be said with much concentration on its meaning and with sincerity. In the weekday morning services, especially among Ashkenazim, when the worshippers are wearing their tefillin, it is common reverently to touch the arm tefillin during the first half of the verse ("Your hand") and then the head tefillin during the second half ("its desire"). At other times, when tefillin are not worn, in addition to the concentration on the meaning of the verse, it is a custom (primarily Mizrahi but also practiced by others) to lift up one's upturned hands as if to receive God's gifts.

The final verse of the prayer is Psalm 115:18. From as early as the time of Seder Rav Amram Gaon, this was explained as instituted in order to provide a concluding "Halleluyah" for the psalm, in line with the pattern of Psalms 146-150. Additionally, the addendum broadens the psalm by saying “we” and not just “I”.

== Concepts ==
Ashrei is about three concepts. These are:

1. People are happy when they are close to God.
2. God cares about the poor and oppressed.
3. God rewards good behavior and punishes evil.

The Psalm praises God whose justice and mercy applies to all peoples. In verse 9 (ט) we are told "The LORD is good to all and His mercy extends to all He has created." By verse 21 (ת) - "All flesh shall praise Your name ...." - all mankind expresses its gratitude.

Also significantly, this prayer is entirely praise of God, without asking for anything.

Also emphasized in Ashrei is God's kingship over all the universe; in particular, Psalm 145:1 is the Bible's only use of the phrase "God the King" (as distinguished from many occurrences of "my king" or "our king").

== See also ==
- Psalm 145
- Ashrei. Structure of the Psalm 145. myjewishlearning.com
