= Selichot =

Jewish penitential poetry

Leil Selichot
- Official name: ליל הסליחות
- Type: Jewish
- 2025 date: Evening, 13 September
- 2026 date: Evening, 5 September
- 2027 date: Evening, 25 September
- 2028 date: Evening, 16 September

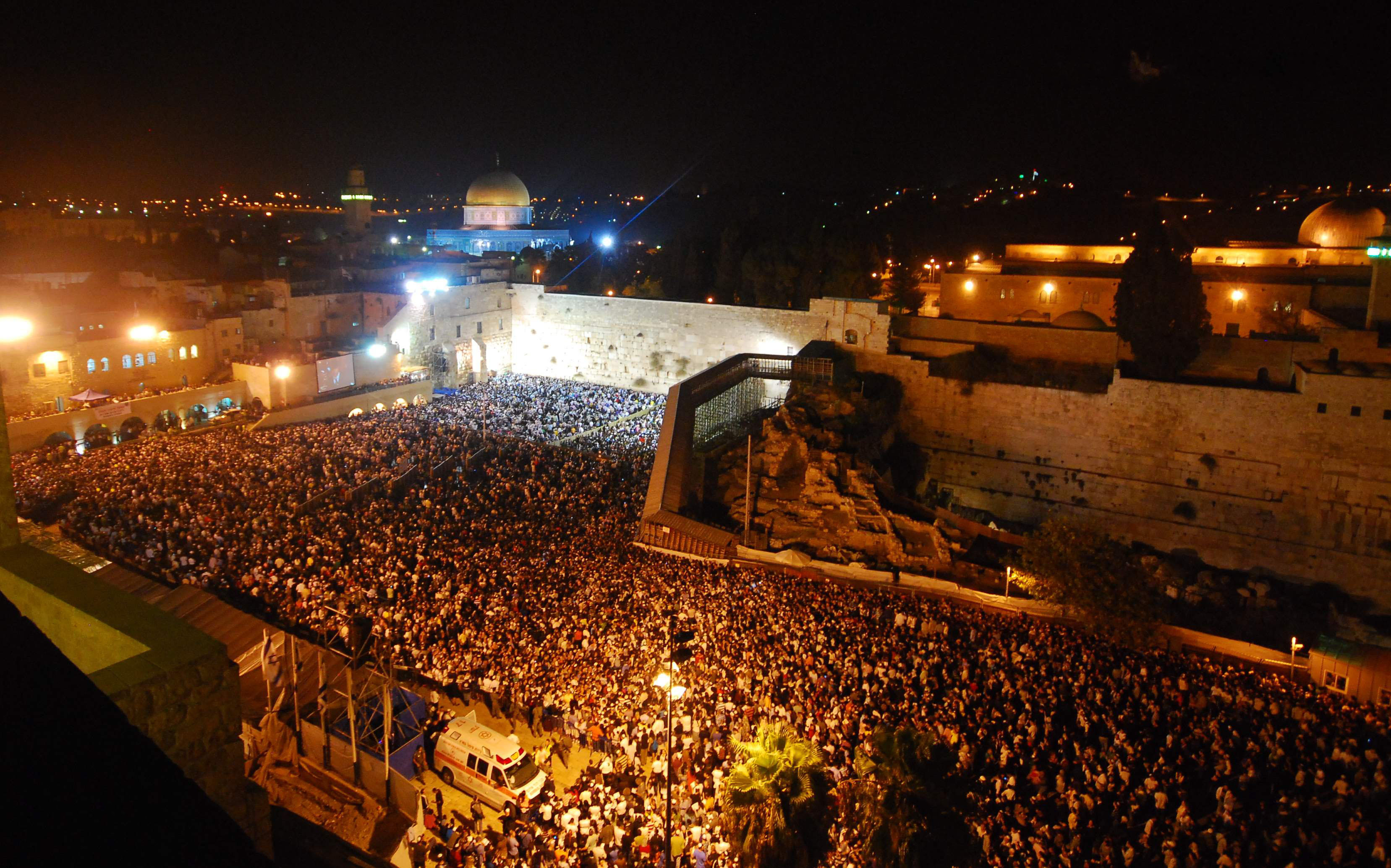
Crowd performing Selichot and Annulment of Vows (Hatarat Nedarim) at the Western Wall in Jerusalem.

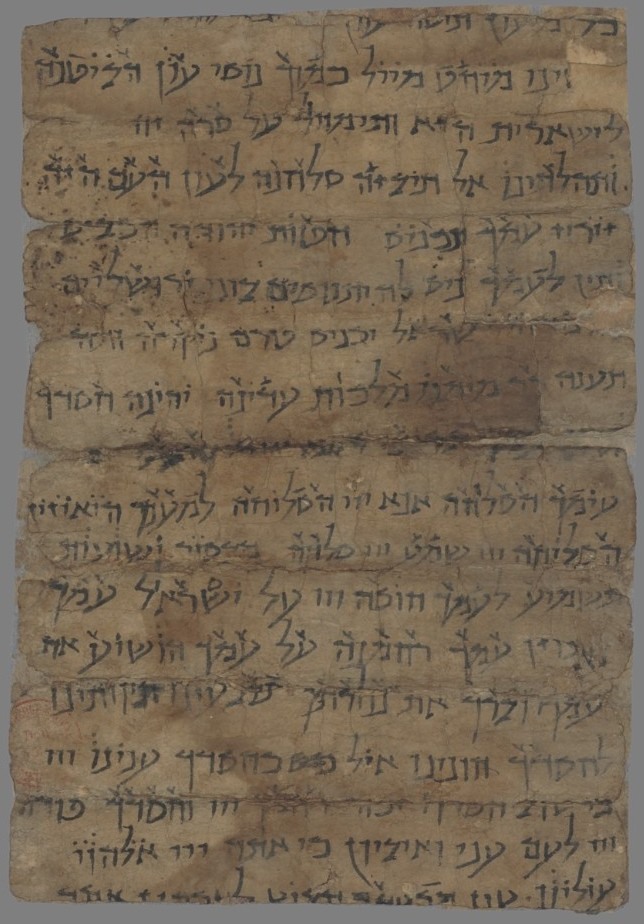
Selichot prayer leaf (c. 8th–9th century) discovered in the famous Mogao Caves of Dunhuang, Gansu, China in 1908 by Paul Pelliot.

Selichot (Hebrew: סְלִיחוֹת, romanized: səliḥoṯ, singular: סליחה, səliḥā) are Jewish penitential poems and prayers, especially those said in the period leading up to the High Holidays, and on fast days. The Thirteen Attributes of Mercy are a central theme throughout these prayers.

== Selichot of the High Holidays ==
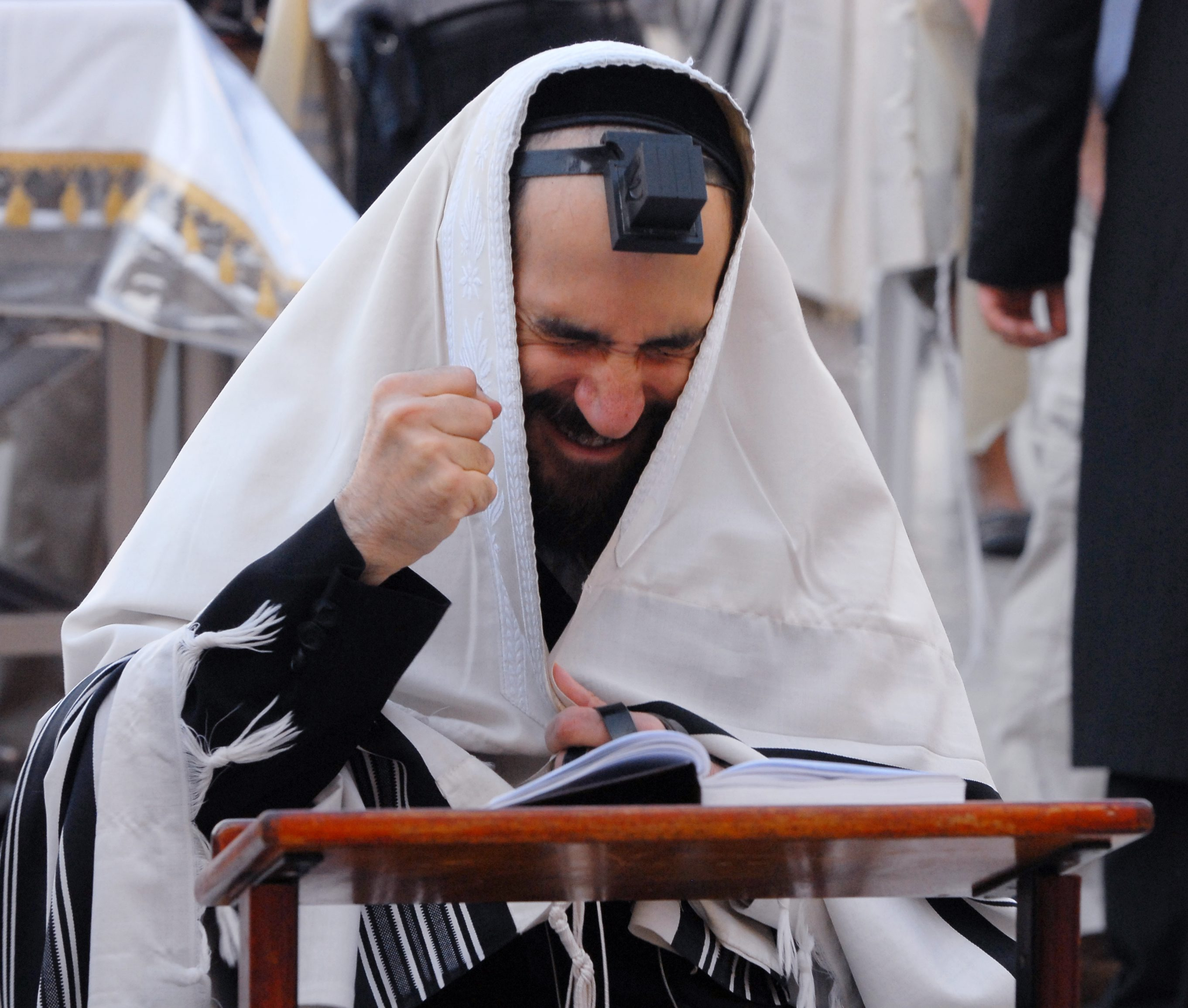
Man reciting Slichot prayers at the Western Wall, 2008

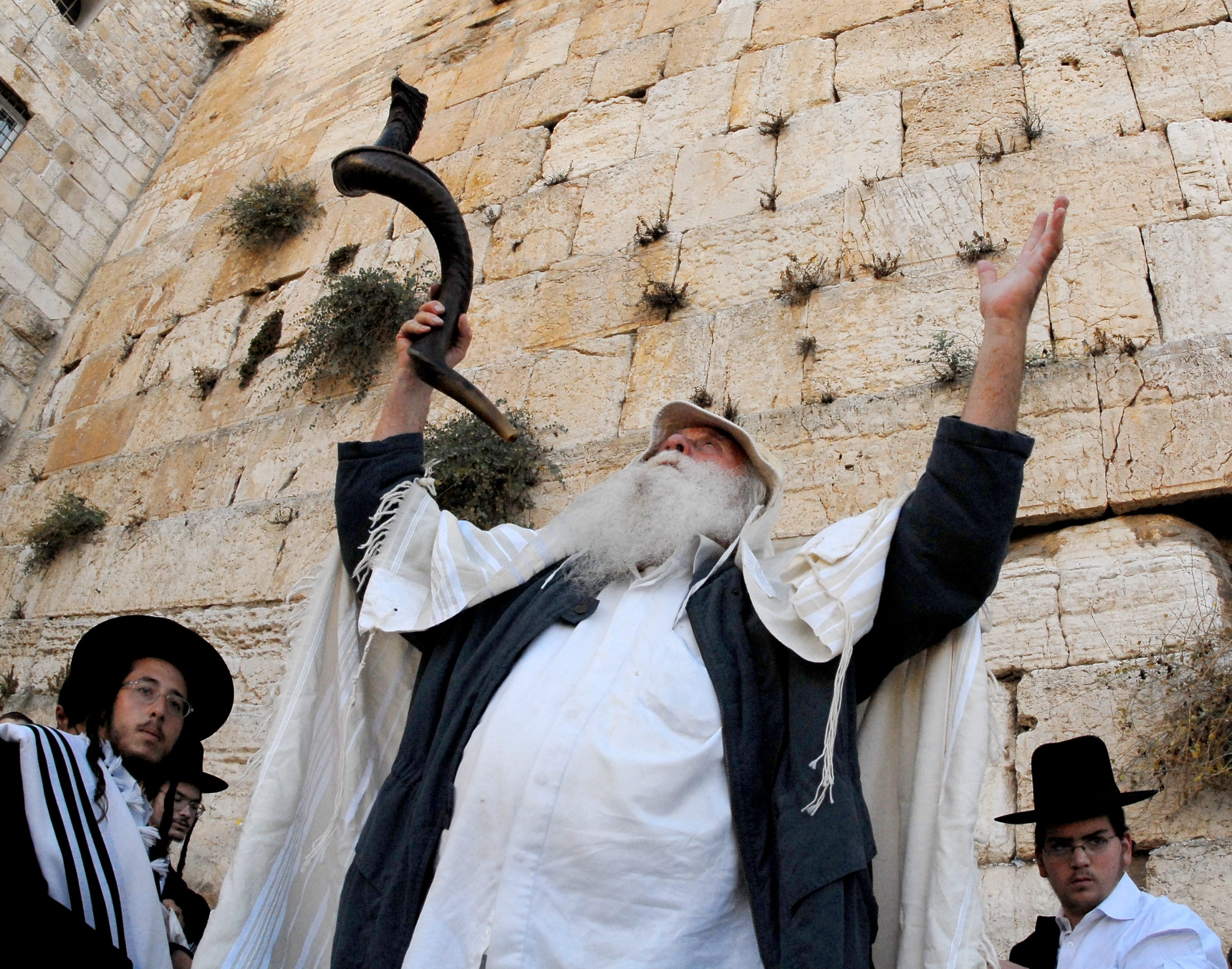
Another man with a shofar during the Slichot prayers, also at the Western Wall.

In the Sephardic tradition, recital of Selichot in preparation for the High Holidays begins on the second day of the Hebrew month of Elul. In the Ashkenazi tradition, in years where the first day of Rosh Hashanah begins on a Thursday or Saturday, selichot are recited from the Saturday night before Rosh Hashanah. If, however, the first day of Rosh Hashanah falls on a Monday or Tuesday, selichot are recited from the Saturday night more than a week before Rosh Hashanah to ensure that it is recited at least four times. This may be because originally the pious would fast for ten days during the season of repentance, and four days before Rosh Hashanah were added to compensate for the four of the Ten Days of Repentance on which fasting is forbidden – the two days of Rosh Hashanah, Shabbat Shuvah, and the day preceding Yom Kippur—and, while the fasts are observed by very few today, the Selichot that accompanied them have been retained. Alternatively, the Rosh Hashanah liturgy includes the Biblical phrase "you shall observe a burnt offering", and like an offering which needs to be scrutinised for defects for four days, so too four days of self-searching are needed before the day of judgment.

In the Italian rite, selichot always begin on a Monday or Thursday shortly before Rosh Hashanah. If Rosh Hashanah falls on Monday, they begin the previous Monday. If Rosh Hashanah falls on a Tuesday, they begin on the Monday eight days before. If Rosh Hashana falls on Thursday, they begin the previous Thursday. If Rosh Hashanah falls on Shabbat, they begin the Monday of that week.

Selichot refers to both the piyyutim that compose the service as well as to the service itself. In most Sephardic communities, selichot services are identical each day. However, some North African communities recited different selichot on Mondays, Thursdays and Shabbat, following the order in Siftei Renanot, while keeping the "standard" order on days without Torah Reading. In the Eastern Ashkenazic tradition, although the text and length of specific prayers varies from day to day, the overall format remains the same and is prefaced by Ashrei (Psalms 145) and the Half-Kaddish. In the Western Ashkenazic tradition, there is similarly an overall format, but it begins with Adon Olam or Lecha Hashem Ha'Tzedaka, and the Half-Kaddish follows the first set of the thirteen attributes.

Selichot are usually recited between midnight and dawn. Some recite it at night after the Maariv prayer, or in the morning before Shacharit, due to the convenience of synagogue attendance when a prayer is already taking place there.

The most popular night of Selichot in the Ashkenazi tradition is the first night, when many women and girls as well as men and boys attend the late-night service on Saturday night. In some communities, the hazzan wears a kittel and sings elaborate melodies. In some congregations, it is not unusual for a choir to participate in this first night's service. In the Eastern Ashkenazic tradition, this night also has more Selichot than any other night prior to Rosh Hashanah eve. The other nights are sometimes more sparsely attended and those services are often led by a layperson, rather than a trained musician, and with melodies that are less elaborate than the first night.

In addition to the Selichot of the High Holiday period, the recitation of Selichot on Yom Kippur itself is the centerpiece and most important part of the liturgy, recited in all of the prayers of the day. Beginning in the late 19th Century, many communities in Eastern Europe stopped reciting Selichot except at Maariv and Neilah. Western Ashkenazic communities, as well as a small number of Eastern Ashkenazic communities, maintain the recitation of Selichot in all of the prayers of Yom Kippur. Italian rite communities recite Selichot on Yom Kippur in all of the prayers except Musaf. Sephardic communities also recite Selichot at all of the prayers of Yom Kippur, although they recite them after the Chazzan's repetition rather than as a part of it.

=== Categories of Selichot ===
Categories of Selichot in the Ashkenazic tradition may include:

- Selichah (סליחה 'forgiveness') – This is the default Selichah and comprises the vast majority of the Selichot service. These can be subdivided into categories of Sheinya (with two line stanzas), Shelishiya (with three line stanzas) and Shalmonit (with four line stanzas).
- Pizmon (פזמון 'chorus') – These central Selichot vary according to the day and contain a chorus which is repeated after each stanza.
- Akeidah (עקידה 'binding', a word which specifically refers to the Binding of Isaac) – This Selichah contains the theme of the Akeidah as a merit for God answering our prayers. In the Ashkenazic selichot rites, these poems are recited on the eve of Rosh Hashanah, during the Ten Days of Repentance, and on Yom Kippur itself (but not during the first days of selichot prior to the eve of Rosh Hashanah). Depending on the specific rite, these poems are recited immediately before or immediately after the Pizmon.
- Chatanu (חטאנו 'we have sinned') – In the Lithuanian rite, starting on the evening before Rosh Hashanah - and in the Western rites, even on the first days - and continuing through Yom Kippur, this Selichah is said after the final recitation of the Thirteen Attributes and before the Vidui confessional. It contains as its refrain, "חטאנו צורנו סלח לנו יוצרנו" ('We have sinned, our Rock; forgive us, our Creator'). In the Polish and Bohemian rites, these poems are recited only on Yom Kippur itself, and even then they are often omitted or abbreviated. Perhaps the most famous Chatanu Selichah is the martyrology from the Midrash Eleh Ezkerah recited in the Eastern Ashkenazic rite during Musaf on Yom Kippur or at other times in other rites. The recitation of this refrain has been partially or entirely abandoned in many communities.
- Techinah (תחינה 'petition') – It is recited during Tachnun at the very end of the Selichot service. In the Ashkenazic selichot rites, these poems are recited on the eve of Rosh Hashanah and during the Ten Days of Repentance (but generally not during the first days of selichot prior to the eve of Rosh Hashanah).

== Selichot of Fast Days ==
On minor fast days (including the Fast of Behav), most communities recite Selichot at some point during the Shacharit service (as opposed to before Shacharit). In contemporary practice, most communities recite these Selichot after the conclusion of the Shacharit Amidah. In some communities (especially Western Ashkenazic communities, but also some Eastern Ashkenazic communities), the older practice is maintained to insert the recitation of the Selichot of minor fast days in the middle of the blessing for forgiveness (סלח לנו כי חטאנו) in the repetition of the Shacharit Amidah. The content of many of these prayers is related to the specific fast day.

In Ashkenazic communities, Selichot are recited on the Fast of Gedaliah only before the prayer service like the selichot of the High Holidays; in many Sephardic communities, additional selichot are recited after the Amidah just like any other fast day. Selichot are not recited in any community today on the major fast day of Tisha B'Av, although they were recited by the Geonim of Babylonia.

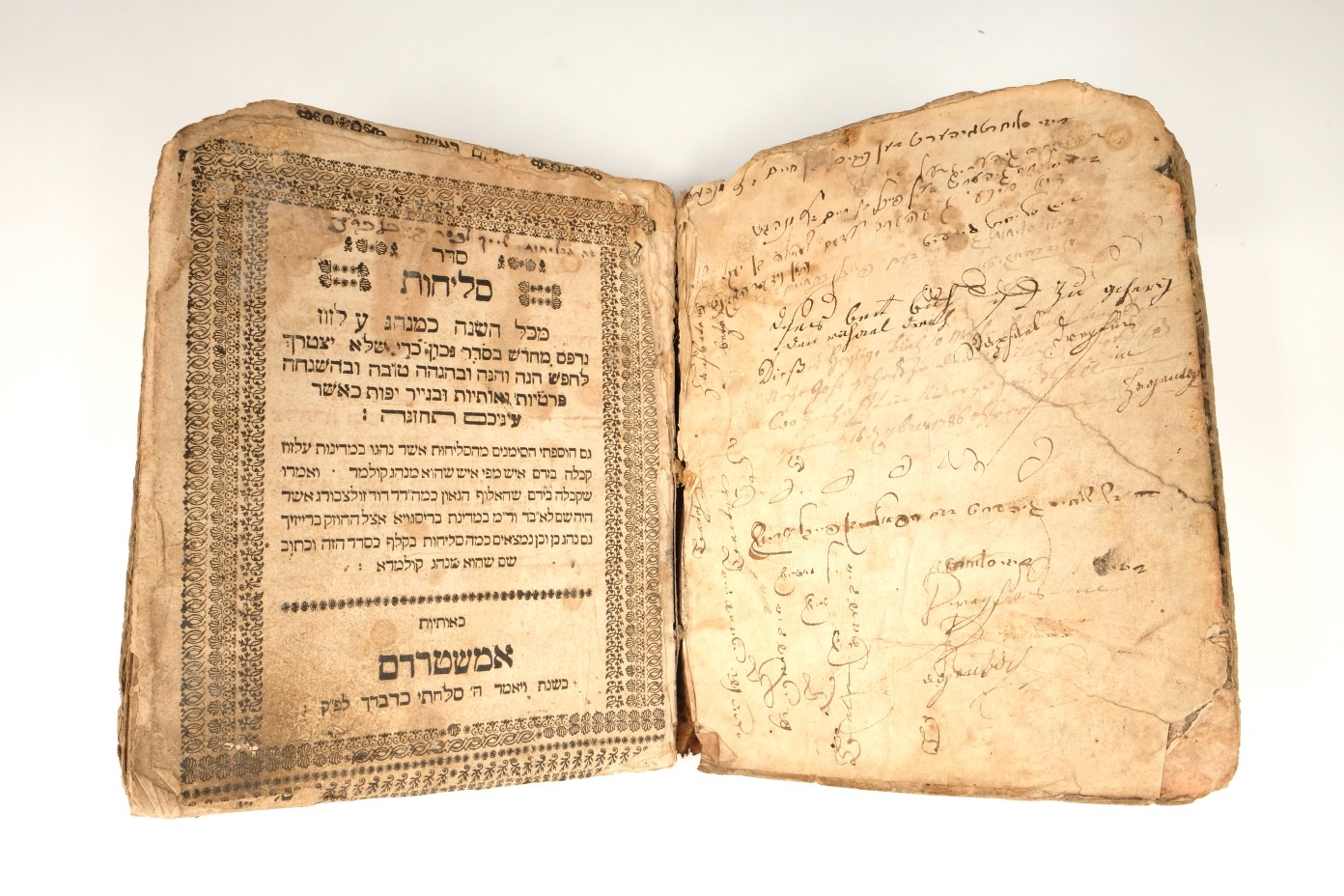
Prayer book Selichot Minhag from Alsace, 1766, in the collection of the Jewish Museum of Switzerland. A full scan of a different copy of this books is available here.

== Selichot on other occasions ==
In addition to High Holidays and Fast Days, there were communities that recited Selichot on Hoshana Rabbah.

Additionally, in the early modern period, there were "shomerim la-boker societies" which recited Selichot on every day of the year that Tachanun is recited.

== Selichot rites ==
Until approximately the 15th century, there was no set order for selichot, and the chazzan in each community would pick which piyyutim to recite each day. Beginning in the 15th century, each region of the Ashkenazic world developed its own order. There are at least thirteen Ashkenazic printed rites for selichot:

The following eight are variations of the Western Ashkenazic rite:

1. Frankfurt and its surroundings
2. Alsace
3. Italian Ashkenazim
4. Nuremberg and Fürth
5. Switzerland and Swabia
6. Worms
7. Cologne
8. Floß

The following five are variations of the Eastern Ashkenazic rite:

1. Poland (Polin)
2. Bohemia, Moravia, Silesia, and Hungary
3. Lithuania and Samogitia (Lita and Zamut)
4. Poznań and Grodno
5. Old Synagogue in Prague

Among 21st century Ashkenazi Jewish communities, the Polin and Lita variations are dominant, although Bohemia is the most common in England. Some associate Lita with Nusach Ashkenaz and Polin with Nusach Sefard, likely because in early 20th Century most Jews in Poland had adopted Nusach Sefard, whereas most Jews in Lithuania maintained Nusach Ashkenaz. However, the differences between Polin and Lita Selichot have origins over a hundred years before the advent of Nusach Sefard, and the minhagim were geographic rather than ideological. Chabad recites Selichot according to Nusach Lita because they are from Lithuania, and there are Polish mitnagdim who recite Selichot according to Nusach Polin.

The poems recited in the major variations, with their assigned numbers, for the days proceeding Rosh Hashanah and the Ten Days of Repentance (but not including the Selichot for the prayers of Yom Kippur itself) are as follows (page numbers in superscript to the right):

Title	Frankfurt		Bohemia, Moravia, Silesia, Hungary		Lita		Polin	
Title	Day	No.	Day	No.	Day	No.	Day	No.
אָב לְרַחֵם וְרַב סְלוֹחַ חוֹלַלְתָּנוּ	5 of TDR	104			Erev RH	37		
אָבְדוּ חַכְמֵי גָזִית	4 of TDR	93						
אֲבוֹתַי כְּרַבְתָּ רִיבָם	6	31						
אָבְלָה נַפְשִׁי	FG	61	FG	44	FG	48	FG	44
אָדוֹן, בִּינָה הַגִיגֵנוּ	1	6			2 of TDR	67		
אָדוֹן, בְּפָקְדְךָ אֱנוֹשׁ לַבְּקָרִים	Erev RH	38	Erev RH	29	Erev RH	34	Erev RH	29
אָדוֹן, בְּפָקְדְךָ אֱנוֹשׁ לַבְּקָרִים	Erev YK	113	Erev YK	88	Erev YK	98	Erev YK	86
אָדוֹן, בְּשָׁפְטְךָ אֱנוֹשׁ רִמָּה	Erev RH	39	Erev RH	28	Erev RH	35	Erev RH	30
אָדוֹן, בְּשָׁפְטְךָ אֱנוֹשׁ רִמָּה	Erev YK	114						
אָדוֹן, דִּין אִם יְדֻקְדַּק	Erev RH	48	Erev RH	34			Erev RH	28
אָדוֹן, דִּין אִם יְדֻקְדַּק	Erev YK	122	Erev YK	89	Erev YK	99	Erev YK	85
אָדוֹן, מוֹעֵד כְּתִקַּח	Erev RH	40	Erev RH	25	Erev RH	25	Erev RH	27
אָדוֹן, מוֹעֵד כְּתִקַּח	Erev YK	112						
אָדוֹן, מִשְׁפָּט בְּקִרְבָּךְ	7	36						
אָדָם אֵיךְ יִזְכֶּה			Erev RH	33			Erev RH	32
אֲדֹנָי שְׁמָעָה אֲדֹנָי סְלָחָה	4	20						
אַהֲבַת עִזּוּז וְתוֹקֶף חִבָּה	Erev YK	126	5 of TDR	86				
אֹהֶל שִׁכֵּן אִם רִקֵּן	4 of TDR	96						
אוֹדֶה עֲלֵי פִשְׁעִי	4 of TDR	98						
אֱוִילֵי הַמַּתְעֶה מַרְגִּיז וּמַחֲטִיא			Erev RH	32				
אֱוִילֵי מִדֶּרֶךְ פִּשְׁעָם	5 of TDR	108						
אִוִּיתִיךָ קִוִּיתִיךָ מֵאֶרֶץ מֶרְחַקִּים	4	18	2	7	2	6	5	14
אוֹמֶץ יוֹסִיף טְהוֹר יָדַיִם			5 of TDR	83	5 of TDR	91		
אוֹרַח צְדָקָה	FG	64						
אוֹרְךָ וַאֲמִתְּךָ שְׁלַח	Erev RH	47	2 of TDR	55	FG	50	FG	46
אוֹרְךָ וַאֲמִתְּךָ שְׁלַח	Erev YK	121						
אָז בְּהַר מוֹר	5 of TDR	106	Erev RH	39	5 of TDR	92	FG	49
אָז טֶרֶם נִמְתְּחוּ נִבְלֵי שְׁכָבִים	5 of TDR	100	FG	42	FG	46	FG	42
אָז קַשְׁתִּי וְחַרְבִּי	4	21						
אֱזוֹן תַּחַן	5	24	5 of TDR	84	5 of TDR	89	5 of TDR	81
אָזְנְךָ הַטֵּה וְהַקְשֵׁב			5 of TDR	80				
אֶזְעַק אֶל אֶלֹהִים קוֹלִי			3 of TDR	64	Erev RH	36	2 of TDR	55
אֶזְרָחִי הֵעִיר מִמִזְרָח					3 of TDR	74		
אֶזְרָחִי מֵעֵבֶר הַנָּהָר	FG	66	4 of TDR	76	2 of TDR	65	3 of TDR	66
אַיֵּה כָּל נִפְלְאוֹתֶיךָ הַגְּדוֹלוֹת וְהַנּוֹרָאוֹת	3	14	4	12	4	12	4	12
אַיֵּה קִנְאָתְךָ וּגְבוּרֹתֶךָ			2	6	6	18	5	15
אֲיַחֵד צוּרִי בְּרוֹב הוֹדָאוֹת					FG	56		
אֵיךְ אוּכַל לָבֹא עָדֶיךָ	4 of TDR	91			2 of TDR	64	3 of TDR	64
אֵיךְ נִפְתַּח פֶּה לְפָנֶיךָ	1	1	1	1	1	1	1	1
אֵיךְ נִפְתַּח פֶּה לְפָנֶיךָ	FG	60						
אֵיכָכָה אֶפְצֶה פֶּה	5 of TDR	103			Erev RH	24	Erev RH	24
אֵין כְּמִדַּת בָּשָׂר מִדָּתֶךָ	3	12	5	15	3	8	2	6
אֵין מִי יִקְרָא בְצֶדֶק	5	22	1	2	1	2	1	2
אֵין תְּלוּיָה לְרֹאשׁ			7	21				
אֵיתָן לִמַּד דַּעַת	2 of TDR	76	3 of TDR	67	4 of TDR	83	2 of TDR	58
אַךְ בְּךָ לַדָּל מָעוֹז	Erev RH	43	Erev RH	31			Erev RH	31
אַךְ בְּךָ לַדָּל מָעוֹז	Erev YK	117						
אַךְ בְּךָ מִקְוֵה יִשְׂרָאֵל	4 of TDR	92			2 of TDR	61	3 of TDR	61
אַךְ בְּמֵתַח דִּין	Erev RH	41	Erev RH	30			Erev RH	33
אַךְ בְּמֵתַח דִּין	Erev YK	115						
אֶל אֱלוֹהַּ דָּלְפָה עֵינִי			Erev RH	27	Erev RH	28	Erev RH	26
אֶל אֱלֹקִים אֶצְעֲקָה בְּמִלּוּלִי	Erev YK	128						
אֵל אֱמוּנָה עֶזְרָה הָבָה					Erev RH	29	Erev RH	34
אַל בְּאַפְּךָ פֶּן תַּמְעִיט	Erev RH	44						
אַל בְּאַפְּךָ פֶּן תַּמְעִיט	Erev YK	118						
אֶל הַר הַמּוֹר	3 of TDR	86	2 of TDR	58			5 of TDR	83
אַל יִמְעַט לְפָנֶיךָ			7	22				
אֵל נָא רְפָא נָא	5	26						
אַל נָא תְּיַסֵּר בָּאֵי עָדֶיךָ	Erev RH	42						
אַל נָא תְּיַסֵּר בָּאֵי עָדֶיךָ	Erev YK	116						
אַל תָּבוֹא בְּמִשְׁפָּט עִמָּנוּ							Erev RH	37
אֵלֶה אֶזְכְּרָה	Erev RH	55						
אֵלֶיךָ ה' אֶקְרָא אָיוֹם	6	27					4 of TDR	69
אֵלֶיךָ ה' שִׁוַּעְתִּי	2 of TDR	75	4 of TDR	72			3 of TDR	62
אֵלֶיךָ הָאֵל					3 of TDR	70		
אֵלֶיךָ לֵב וָנֶפֶשׁ	2 of TDR	70	3 of TDR	60	2 of TDR	60	2 of TDR	52
אֵלֶיךָ נְשׂוּאוֹת עֵינֵינוּ	4	17					3	9
אֵלֶיךָ צוּרִי כַּפַּיִם שִׁטַחתִּי					Erev RH	41		
אֵלְכָה וְאָשׁוּבָה			3 of TDR	63			2 of TDR	54
אֱלֹקַי בּוֹשְׁתִּי			2 of TDR	52				
אֱלֹקִים אֲדֹנָי חֵילִי			4 of TDR	73	5 of TDR	90		
אֱלֹקִים אֵין בִּלְתֶּךָ	Erev RH	46	FG	46	2 of TDR	63	3 of TDR	63
אֱלֹקִים אֵין בִּלְתֶּךָ	Erev YK	120						
אֱלֹקִים אַל דֳּמִי לְדָמִי	Erev RH	50						
אֱלֹקִים אַל דֳּמִי לְדָמִי	Erev YK	124						
אֱלֹקִים אַל דֳּמִי, אֵל נִקְשָׁר בִּשְׁמִי	5 of TDR	105						
אֱלֹקִים בְּיִשְׂרָאֵל גָּדוֹל נוֹדָעְתָּ	7	33			5	15	5 of TDR	78
אֱלֹקִים יִרְאֶה לּוֹ שֶׂה					Erev RH	30		
אִם אָמְרִי אֶשְׁכְּחָה	3 of TDR	81	5	16				
אִם אָפֵס רֹבַע הַקֵּן			FG	49	FG	52	4 of TDR	74
אִם עֲו‍ֹנֵינוּ עָנוּ בָנוּ	6	30			7	22		
אִם עֲוֹנֵינוּ רַבּוּ לְהַגְדִּיל	2	9	1	3	2	5	2	5
אָמוֹן פִּתְחֵי תְשׁוּבָה					5 of TDR	96		
אֱמוּנִים בְּנֵי מַאֲמִינִים	Erev RH	52						
אָמְנָם אֲנַחְנוּ חָטָאנוּ וְהֶעֱוִינוּ					4 of TDR	79		
אִמַּנְתָּ מֵאָז	FG	62	FG	45	FG	49	FG	45
אָמַרְנוּ נִגְזַרְנוּ לָנוּ	3 of TDR	84	4 of TDR	74			2 of TDR	56
אֱמֶת אַתָּה הוּא רִאשׁוֹן					Erev RH	31		
אָנָּא הַבֵּט	Erev RH	58						
אָנָּא הַבֵּט	Erev YK	130						
אָנָּא עוֹרְרָה אַהֲבָתְךָ			Erev RH	26	Erev RH	27	Erev RH	25
אֱנוֹשׁ, בַּמֶּה יִצְדַּק	5 of TDR	101	3 of TDR	62				
אֱנוֹשׁ, עַד דַּכָּא תָּשֵׁב	3 of TDR	82	3 of TDR	61				
אֲנַחְנוּ הַחֹמֶר וְאַתָּה יוֹצְרֵנוּ			2 of TDR	54			7	20
אֲנִי בְּרֹב חַסְדְּךָ	2 of TDR	71					5 of TDR	77
אֲנִי יוֹם אִירָא אֵלֶיךָ אֶקְרָא	2	8	6	18	3	9	4	11
אֲנִי עַבְדְּךָ בֶּן אֲמָתֶךָ	Erev RH	53						
אֲנִי קְרָאתִיךָ					4	11	2 of TDR	53
אֶנְקַת מְסַלְדֶיךָ					Erev RH	43		
אַנְשֵׁי אֲמָנָה אָבָדוּ	1	2						
אַנְשֵׁי אֲמָנָה עָבָרוּ	1	3						
אָפֵס הוֹד כְּבוֹדָהּ	5 of TDR	102			7	21		
אֶקְרָא אֶל אֱלֹקִים קוֹלִי	3 of TDR	85						
אֶקְרָא בְשִׁמְךָ לְהַחֲזִיק בָּךְ			3	9	6	17		
אַרְבָּעָה אבוֹת נְזִיקִין הֵן					4 of TDR	80		
אָרִיד בְּשִׂיחִי	3	16			4 of TDR	85		
אַרְיֵה בַיַּעַר דָּמִיתִי	3 of TDR	83	4	13	2 of TDR	62	7	21
אָרְכוּ הַיָּמִים	5	23					6	18
אַרְכָן וְקַצְרָן	6	28						
אֲשַׁם בַּעֲלֵי אַשְׁמָה			2 of TDR	53				
אֶשְׁמְרָה אֵלֶיךָ עֻזִּי	3 of TDR	88						
אֶשְׁפּוֹךְ שִׂיחִי לְפָנֶיךָ צוּרִי	Erev RH	49						
אֶשְׁפּוֹךְ שִׂיחִי לְפָנֶיךָ צוּרִי	Erev YK	123						
אֵשֶׁת נְעוּרִים הָאֲהוּבָה			4 of TDR	69	4 of TDR	78		
אֶת ה' בְּהִמָּצְאוֹ	2 of TDR	72	FG	43	FG	47	FG	43
אֶת הַקּוֹל קוֹל יַעֲקֹב נוֹהֵם	Erev RH	51						
אֶת הַקּוֹל קוֹל יַעֲקֹב נוֹהֵם	Erev YK	125						
אֶת פְּנֵי מֵבִין יוֹדְעֵי דִּין דָּל	7	32						
אֶת צוֹם הַשְּׁבִיעִי	FG	63						
אַתָּה אֱלֹקַי מַלְכִּי מִקֶּדֶם			4 of TDR	70				
אַתָּה הָרוֹאֶה בְּעֶלְבּוֹן נֶעֱלָבִים			5 of TDR	79				
אַתָּה חֶלְקִי וְצוּר לְבָבִי	4 of TDR	95	5 of TDR	82	4 of TDR	81	5 of TDR	79
אַתָּה מִקֶּדֶם אֱלֹהֵינוּ	3	13					4 of TDR	70
בְּאַשְׁמֹרֶת הַבֹּקֶר קְרָאתִיךָ אֵל מְהֻלָּל	3 of TDR	87	4	14	2 of TDR	66	4	13
בֵּין כֶּסֶה לֶעָשׂוֹר			2 of TDR	57	4 of TDR	84	2 of TDR	57
בְּמוֹצָאֵי מְנוּחָה קִדַּמְנוּךָ תְּחִלָּה	1	5	1	5	1	4	1	4
בְּתוּלַת בַּת יְהוּדָה			6	19	7	20		
גָּדוֹל עֲוֹנִי וְלַחֲטוֹא הוֹסַפְתִּי	2 of TDR	78						
גְרוֹנִי נִחַר זוֹעֵק חָמָס					FG	59		
ה' אֱלֹהֵי הַצְבָאוֹת	Erev RH	37	Erev RH	24	Erev RH	23	Erev RH	23
ה' אֱלֹקֵי הַצְבָאוֹת נוֹרָא בָעֶלְיוֹנִים	Erev YK	111						
ה' אֱלֹקֵי יִשְׂרָאֵל	7	34	4 of TDR	71	5 of TDR	88		
ה' אֱלֹקַי רַבַּת צְרָרוּנִי	Erev RH	45						
ה' אֱלֹקַי רַבַּת צְרָרוּנִי	Erev YK	119						
ה' ה' אֵל רַחוּם	5	25	5 of TDR	85	5 of TDR	93	5 of TDR	82
ה' שׁוֹמְרִי לְבֵיתְךָ נָאֲוָה	5 of TDR	110						
הוֹרֵיתָ דֶרֶךְ תְּשׁוּבָה	FG	67	FG	48	FG	53	FG	48
וּבְכֵן יְהִי רָצוֹן מִלְּפָנֶיךָ	Erev RH	57						
זְכוֹר בְּרִית אַבְרָהָם	Erev RH	56	Erev RH	40	Erev RH	42	Erev RH	40
זְכוֹר בְּרִית אַבְרָהָם	Erev YK	129						
זְכוֹר בְּרִית אַבְרָהָם					FG	54	FG	50
זְכוֹר בְּרִית אַבְרָהָם					5 of TDR	95		
חוֹקֵר הַכֹּל וְסוֹקֵר			6	20	4	13		
חָטָאנוּ צוּרֵנוּ					5 of TDR	94		
חַיִּים אֲרוּכִים					Erev RH	32	Erev RH	35
חָנֵּנוּ ה' חָנֵּנוּ			7	23			6	19
יוֹשֵׁב בְּגָבְהֵי מְרוֹמִים	2	11			3 of TDR	76		
יוֹשֵׁב בְּסֵתֶר עֶלְיוֹן			4 of TDR	75	6	19	7	22
יַחְבִּיאֵנוּ צֵל יָדוֹ			5	17			3 of TDR	65
יַעֲזוֹב רָשָׁע נְתִיבוֹ					FG	57		
יָקרוּ רֵעֶיךָ רַב מְחוֹלֵל					FG	55		
יְרוּשָׁלַיִם אֶת ה'					3 of TDR	73		
יֵרָצֶה צוֹם עַמְּךָ	Erev YK	127	Erev YK	90	Erev YK	100	Erev YK	87
יַשְׁמִיעֵנוּ סָלַחְתִּי			3 of TDR	66	5	16	4 of TDR	73
יִשְׂרָאֵל נוֹשַׁע בַּה' תְּשׁוּעַת עוֹלָמִים	3	15	2	8	2	7	3	10
יִשְׂרָאֵל עַמְּךָ תְּחִנָּה עוֹרְכִים	2	7			5	14	3	8
כִּי הִנֵּה כַּחוֹמֶר	5 of TDR	107						
כִּסֵּא כוֹנֵן בְּחַסְדֶּךָ	FG	68						
לְךָ אֲדֹנָי הַצְּדָקָה תִּלְבֹּשֶׁת	7	35						
מַלְאֲכֵי רַחֲמִים מְשָׁרְתֵי עֶלְיוֹן	2	10			3	10	2	7
מֶלֶךְ אֶחָד יִהְיֶה			Erev RH	36	Erev RH	33		
מֶלֶךְ מְלָכִים	2 of TDR	79	4 of TDR	77	4 of TDR	86	4 of TDR	75
מְפַלְטִי אֵלִי צוּרִי					Erev RH	39	Erev RH	39
מִקְוֵה יִשְׂרָאֵל מוֹשִׁיעוֹ	2 of TDR	73	5 of TDR	87	5 of TDR	97	5 of TDR	84
מְרֻבִּים צָרְכֵי עַמְּךָ					Erev RH	26		
עַם ה' חִזְקוּ וְנִתְחַזְּקָה	3 of TDR	80	5 of TDR	78	5 of TDR	87	5 of TDR	76
רוֹעֶה יִשְׂרָאֵל הַאֲזִינָה	2 of TDR	77						
שֶׁבֶת הַכִּסֵּא	3 of TDR	89	3 of TDR	68	2 of TDR	68	3 of TDR	67
שׁוֹמַמְתִּי בְּרוֹב יְגוֹנִי	FG	65	Erev RH	35	3 of TDR	72	4 of TDR	71
שׁוֹפֵט כָּל הָאָרֶץ	Erev RH	54	Erev RH	38	Erev RH	40	Erev RH	38
שׁוֹשַׁנַּת וֶרֶד							4 of TDR	68
שַׁחַר קַמְתִּי	4 of TDR	97	3	11	3 of TDR	75	5	16
שִׁחַרְנוּךָ בִּקַּשְׁנוּךָ	4 of TDR	90	2 of TDR	51	3 of TDR	69	3 of TDR	60
שָׁלוֹם תִּשְׁפּוֹת לָנוּ					4 of TDR	82		
שְׁלֹשׁ עֶשְׂרֵה מִדּוֹת הָאֲמוּרוֹת בַּחֲנִינָה			Erev RH	37	Erev RH	38	Erev RH	36
שַׁעֲרֵי שָׁמַיִם	4 of TDR	99	2 of TDR	59	3 of TDR	77	2 of TDR	59
תָּא שְׁמַע מָרָא דְעָלְמָא	5 of TDR	109						
תָּבֹא לְפָנֶיךָ שַׁוְעַת חִנּוּן	1	4	1	4	1	3	1	3
תּוֹחֶלֶת יִשְׂרָאֵל	2 of TDR	74	2 of TDR	56			5 of TDR	80
תּוֹרָה הַקְּדוֹשָׁה	FG	69	FG	50	FG	58	FG	51
תַּחֲרוּת רֹגֶז הָנִיחַ			3 of TDR	65			4 of TDR	72
תַּעֲנִית צִבּוּר קָבְעוּ	6	29						
תַּעֲרוֹג אֵלֶיךָ כְּאַיָּל	4	19	3	10	3 of TDR	71	6	17
תְּפִלָּה תִקַּח	Erev RH	59	Erev RH	41	Erev RH	44	Erev RH	41
תָּשׁוּב תְּרַחֲמֵנוּ	4 of TDR	94	FG	47	FG	51	FG	47
תְּשׁוּבָה חַשׁוּבָה קְדוּמָה			5 of TDR	81				
