= Ne'ila =

Concluding Jewish prayer service for Yom Kippur

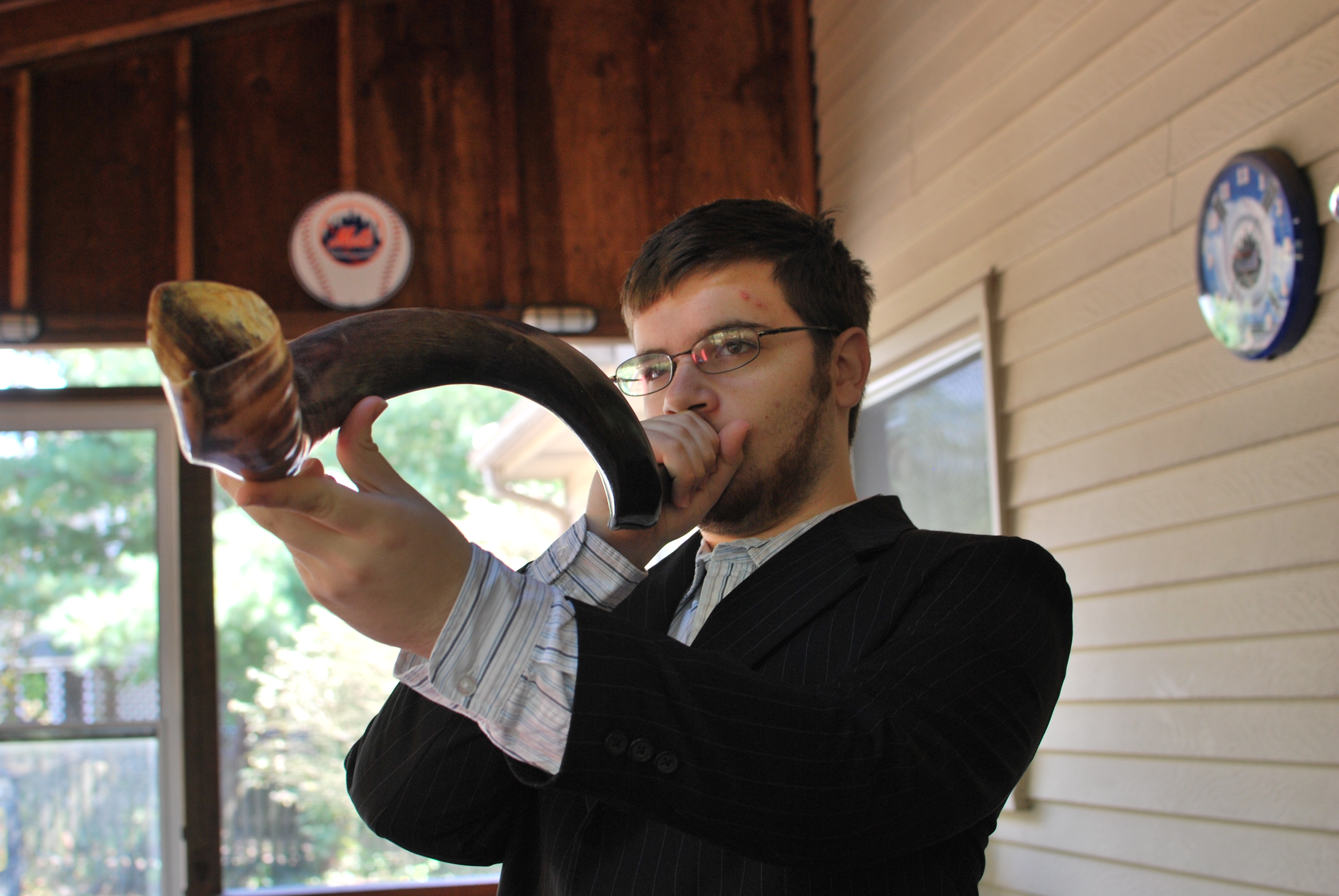
Blowing the shofar.

Ne'ila (Hebrew: נְעִילָה, lit. 'locking'), the concluding service, is a special Jewish prayer service that is held only on Yom Kippur. It is the time when final prayers of repentance are recited at the closing of Yom Kippur. Neilah marks the fifth Amidah of Yom Kippur, the only such occasion in the Hebrew calendar in which there are so many services.

== Contents ==
In the nusach Ashkenaz used by Ashkenazi Jews and the nusach Sefard by Hasidic Jews, Ne'ila begins with the Ashrei and Uva letzion, both of which are postponed from the Mincha service, when they are normally recited on Shabbat and Festivals. In most other rites, Ashrei and Uva letzion are recited as normal at Mincha, and Ashrei alone is repeated at the beginning of Ne'ila. This is followed by Amidah with Selichot and an abbreviated Vidui; in the Ashkenazi rite, it concludes with Avinu Malkeinu. In the Sephardic rite, it begins with the hymn El Nora Alila. At the end of the service, the shofar is blown, and in the Eastern Ashkenazic rite L'Shana Haba'ah ("Nezt Year in Jerusalem") is recited (sometimes sung). The passage first appears as part of the liturgy for Yom Kippur in the Machzor Vitry published in the 12th-13th centuries.

In the Eastern Ashkenazi rite, the Torah ark remains open during the leader's repetition of the Ne'ila Amida, and it is traditional to stand throughout the service. In the Western Ashkenazic rite, like in all of the prayers of Yom Kippur, the ark is open for the entire repetition of the Amida, except it is closed for the Kedushah and Priestly Blessing; most do not stand when it is open. Throughout the High Holy Days, Jews pray to be "'written" in the Book of Life; during Ne'ila, in all such prayers the word 'write' (כתב katav) is replaced by 'seal' (חתם ḥatam).
