= Tzidkatcha =

Shabbat prayer

Tzidkatcha (צדקתך, "Your righteousness") is a prayer consisting of group of three verses that is recited during the afternoon prayer on Shabbat. It is said in memory of three righteous individuals who died on Shabbat: Joseph, Moses and King David. It is recited at this prayer in particular because these individuals died in the afternoon.

== Prayer content and meaning ==
The three verses are: Psalms 119:142, 71:19 and 36:7. They are recited in this order by the Ashkenazic rite and Italian rite, while Sephardi tradition, Nusach Sefard, Yemenite Jews, Nusach Romania, Nusach Provence and Nusach Catalonia recite them in the opposite order, as they appear in Psalms.

The Bach asserts that Moses did not die in the afternoon of Shabbat but of Friday; however, he wasn't buried until Shabbat afternoon. Some say that the recital of this is to recall just judgement because it is immediately after Shabbat that sinners return to Gehinom.

The recitation of these verses represents Jewish acceptance of God's judgment, referred to as Tziduk HaDin (צידוק הדין, "the righteousness of God's judgement"). It expresses the conviction that God is just in his actions, even when they are seemingly negative in human eyes. Because the time for afternoon prayers on Shabbat is near the closing of the day, the saddened atmosphere makes it appropriate for this prayer to be said. On days on which Tachanun would be omitted had it been a weekday, Tzidkatcha is omitted on Shabbat, as the added happiness of the day negates these feelings of sorrow. In the Sephardic tradition, it is recited on Rosh Hashanah and Yom Kippur when they fall on the Sabbath, but in the Ashkenazic tradition it is not. Furthermore, some Western Ashkenazic communities (including Frankfurt) omit it on Shabbat Shuvah.

Because of the somber mood that is hinted to by this prayer, there is a related custom of not wishing the standard Shabbat greeting after the Mincha prayer.
