= Uva letzion =

Jewish prayer

Uva letzion (ובא לציון "and [a redeemer] shall come to Zion") are the first Hebrew words, and colloquially the name, of one of the closing prayers of the morning service. The recitation of this prayer is postponed to Mincha on Shabbat and major Jewish holidays, and in Ashkenazic communities to Ne'ila on Yom Kippur.

== Contents ==
The prayer consists of a series of scriptural verses which include the Kedusha and its Aramaic translation, and two ancient prayers embodying an aspiration for enlightenment and messianic Redemption. It is always preceded immediately or closely by Ashrei (Psalm 145).

== Practice ==
Shulchan Aruch rules that in shacharit, one should not leave the synagogue before Uva letzion.

In Ashkenazic practice, the greater portion is read in an undertone after the Chazzan has intoned the introductory lines; on Shabbat afternoon service they are recited with a bit more of a chant. In Sephardic tradition, there is employed a special chant, of which a variant is used for Psalm 16, recited shortly afterward, at the expiration of Shabbat. In the frequent repetition of a short phrase, and the modification of it to fit the text, it reproduces the chief peculiarity of the worship-music traceable to a Spanish source earlier than 1492.
