= Fast of Gedalia =

Minor fast in Judaism

- Official name: צוֹם גְּדַלְיָה
- Also called: Fast of the seventh month
- Type: Jewish
- Significance: Mourning the assassination of Gedaliah
- Observances: Fasting
- Begins: 3rd day of Tishrei at dawn (If Shabbat, then 4th day of Tishrei at dawn.)
- Ends: The same day, at sunset
- Date: 3 Tishrei
- 2025 date: September 25
- 2026 date: September 14
- Related to: Ten Days of Repentance

The Fast of Gedalia (/ˌɡɛdəˈlaɪ.ə, ɡəˈdɑːliə/; Hebrew: צוֹם גְּדַלְיָה, romanized: Ṣôm Gĕdalyâ), also transliterated as Gedaliah or Gedalya(h), is a minor fast day in mainstream Judaism that lasts from dawn to dusk to lament the assassination of Gedaliah, the final governor of what was the Kingdom of Judah. His death ended Jewish autonomy following the destruction of the First Temple and the fall of King Zedekiah.

== Biblical narrative ==
When Nebuchadnezzar II, ruler of the Neo-Babylonian Empire, conquered Jerusalem, he killed or exiled most of its inhabitants and appointed Gedaliah as governor of the neo-Babylonian province of Yehud.

However, Baalis, king of Ammon, was hostile and envious of the Judean remnant and sent a Judean, Yishmael Ben Netaniah, who was descended from the royal family of Judea, to assassinate Gedaliah. In the seventh month (Tishrei) of 582/1 BCE (some four to five years following the destruction of the Temple, although the exact year is unclear and subject to dispute; others claim the assassination took place in the same year as the destruction), a group of Jews led by Yishmael came to Gedaliah in the town of Mitzpa and were received cordially. Gedaliah had been warned of his guest's murderous intent, but refused to believe his informants, believing their report was mere slander. Yishmael murdered Gedaliah, together with most of the Jews who had joined him and many Babylonians whom the Babylonian king had left with Gedaliah. The remaining Jews feared the vengeance of the Babylonian king (since the king's chosen ruler, Gedaliah, had been killed by a Jew) and fled to Egypt.

The events are recounted briefly in the Hebrew Bible in 2 Kings 25:25–26:

But it came to pass in the seventh month, that Ishmael the son of Nethaniah, the son of Elishama, of the seed royal, came, and ten men with him, and smote Gedaliah, that he died, and the Jews and the Chaldeans that were with him at Mitzpah. And all the people, both small and great, and the captains of the forces, arose, and came to Egypt; for they were afraid of the Chaldeans.

A fuller account is in Jeremiah 41, where the murder of a group of envoys and the kidnapping of the gubernatorial staff and family are also related:

In the seventh month, Ishmael son of Nethaniah son of Elishama, of the royal family, one of the chief officers of the king, came with ten men to Gedaliah son of Ahikam, at Mizpah. As they ate bread together there at Mizpah, Ishmael son of Nethaniah and ten men with him got up and struck down Gedaliah son of Ahikam son of Shaphan with the sword and killed him, because the king of Babylon had appointed him governor in the land. Ishmael also killed all the Judeans who were with Gedaliah at Mizpah, and the Chaldean soldiers who happened to be there.

== In Josephus ==
In Flavius Josephus' Antiquities of the Jews, the story of the conspiracy is provided in considerable detail.

== Institution of fast ==
In remembrance of these tribulations, the Jewish sages instituted the Fast of the Seventh (see Zechariah 8:19) on the day of Gedaliah's assassination in the seventh month.

The Hebrew Bible does not specify on which day of the seventh month Gedaliah was killed. However, the Hebrew word hodesh can mean "new moon" as well as "month", suggesting that he was killed on the first of the month. According to the Talmud, Gedaliah was killed on the third of the month. Other sources suggest that Gedaliah was killed on the first of the month, but the fast is delayed until after Rosh Hashanah, since fasting is prohibited during a festival.

According to the Talmud, the aim of the fast day is "to establish that the death of the righteous is likened to the burning of the House of our God." Just as fasts were ordained to commemorate the destruction of the Jewish Temple, likewise a fast was ordained to commemorate the death of Gedaliah.

Karaite Jews observe this fast day on the 24th of the month since Book of Nehemiah states that the 24th was a fast day.

== Dates ==
The fast is observed on the third of Tishrei in the Hebrew calendar. This is the day after the second day of Rosh Hashanah. The Gregorian (civil) date for the Fast of Gedalia varies from year to year.

When Rosh Hashanah falls on Thursday and Friday, the fast is postponed until Sunday (which would be the fourth of Tishrei), since no public fast may be observed on Shabbat (Saturday) with the exception of Yom Kippur. That was most recently the case in 2024.

Dates of the fast in recent years:

- 2020: Monday, September 21
- 2021: Thursday, September 9
- 2022: Wednesday, September 28
- 2023: Monday, September 18
- 2024: Sunday, October 6
- 2025: Thursday, September 25
- 2026: Monday, September 14
- 2027: Monday, October 4
- 2028: Sunday, September 24

== Observances ==
The fast is observed from dawn until dusk. As with all fast days, the hazzan includes the prayer Aneinu in the repetition of the Amidah during Shacharit and Mincha as a separate Bracha between the prayers for redemption and healing, and individuals recite it in the private recitation of the amidah as an addition to Shema Koleinu (general prayer acceptance); in the Ashkenazic tradition it is recited by individuals only in Mincha, in the Sephardic tradition in Shacharit and Mincha, and in the Yemenite tradition it is recited even at Maariv the night before the fast. The Avinu Malkeinu prayer is recited and as it is during the Ten Days of Repentance the additions reference the new year. A Torah scroll is taken from the ark and the passages of Ki Tissa are read from the Torah (Exodus 32:11–14 and 34:1–10). The same Torah reading is added at Mincha, followed in Ashkenazic congregations by a Haftarah reading.

As the fast falls during the days of Penitence, the Selichot prayer is recited before the start of Shacharit and incorporates an extra paragraph relating to the Fast of Gedalia. In the Ashkenazic rite, there are no Selichot recited at the time of the repetition of the Amidah, but some Sephardic communities do recite additional supplications at this time as well.

In the Spanish and Portuguese rite, the prayers are recited from the Book of Prayers for Fast Days. There are lengthy additions to the prayers that are not found in the daily and Sabbath siddur, and that are specific to the day as well as prayers that are common to all the fast days with the exception of Yom Kippur.
