= Tachanun =

Jewish prayer of supplication

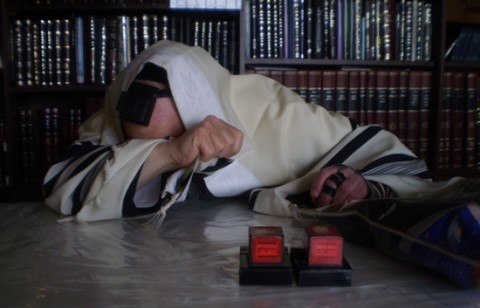
A man reciting tachnun

Tachanun (Hebrew: תַחֲנוּן, romanized: Taḥănûn, lit. 'supplication'), also referred to as nefilat apayim (נְפִילַת אַפַּיִם, 'falling [on the] faces'), is a supplicatory and confessional component of Shacharit (שַחֲרִית, 'dawn') and Mincha (מִנְחָה, 'offering'), the morning and afternoon prayer services of Judaism, respectively. The recitation of Tachanun follows the Amidah, the central part of the daily Jewish prayer services. It is also recited at the end of the Selichot service. It is omitted on Shabbat, Jewish holidays, and many other celebratory occasions (e.g., in the presence of a groom in the week following his marriage). Most Jewish traditions recite a longer prayer on Mondays and Thursdays.

== Format ==
There are two formats of Tachanun: a short and a long one. The long format is reserved for Monday and Thursday mornings, during which the Torah is chanted in the synagogue. The short format, recited on other weekday mornings and afternoons, consists of three (in some communities, two) short paragraphs.

In Nusach Sefard—followed by most Hasidic Jews, who may or may not be Sephardic Jews—and most Sephardic rites (which differ from Sefardic rites despite the similar name), Tachanun begins with vidui (וִדּוּי, 'confessional') and recitation of the Thirteen Attributes of Mercy. Among communities of Sephardic Jews and some Moroccan Jews, these are recited only in the long Tachanun. In vidui, several specific sins are mentioned, and the heart is symbolically struck with the right fist during the mention of each. Vidui is followed by the mention of God's Thirteen Attributes of Mercy. By and large, the Hasidic Jews who follow Nusach Sefard do not rest their heads on their hands for Kabbalistic reasons; Sephardic and some Moroccan Jews, who do not follow Sefardic customs, do.

=== Short Tachanun ===
In most communities using Nusach Ashkenaz, Tachanun begins with introductory verses from 2 Samuel 24:14, which is followed by a short confession—that Israel has sinned and God should answer the Jewish people's prayers—and Psalm 6:2–11, which King David is traditionally believed to have composed while sick and in pain. Most Sephardic communities also recite these verses, although only after reciting vidui and the Thirteen Attributes.

In the Sephardic, Italian, and Romaniote rites—also adopted in some Hasidic communities, including Chabad—Psalm 25 is recited as Tachanun. In Baladi-rite prayer, a prayer from a non-scriptural source is recited.

In the presence of a sefer Torah (סֵפֶר תּוֹרָה, 'Torah book'), this paragraph is recited with the head leaning on the back of the left hand or sleeve (in most Ashkenazic communities, one leans on the right hand when wearing tefillin on the left). The following paragraph, שׁוֹמֵר יִשְׂרָאֵל (lit. 'Guardian [of] Yisrael'), is recited seated but erect (some communities recite it only on fast days).

After this point, and following the words וַאֲנַחְנוּ לֹא נֵדַע (va'anakhnu lo neida; lit. 'and we do not know'), it is customary in many communities to rise, and the remainder of the final paragraph is recited while standing. Other rites' adherents, especially those who do not recite "Guardian of Israel" daily, remain seated but erect for this passage. Tachanun is invariably followed by the half-Kaddish (חֲצִי קַדִּישׁ, khatzi Kaddish) during Shacharit and by the full Kaddish (קַדִּישׁ שָׁלֵם, Kaddish shaleim) during Mincha and recitations of Selichot (סְלִיחוֹת, 'forgivenesses').

=== Long Tachanun ===
The Talmud (Bava Kamma) marks Monday and Thursday as "eth ratzon", a time of divine goodwill during which a supplication is more likely to be received by God. On Monday and Thursday mornings, therefore, a longer prayer is recited. The order differs by custom.

In Nusach Ashkenaz, a long prayer beginning with "ve-hu rachum" is recited before nefilat apayim. After Psalm 6, a few stanzas with a refrain "Hashem elokey Yisra'el" is added. The service continues with Shomer Yisrael (in some communities, this is recited only on fast days), and Tachanun is concluded as usual. Other Nusach Ashkenaz communities, especially in Israel, have adopted the Sephardic custom of reciting Vidui and the Thirteen Attributes at the beginning of long Tachanun. In some of these places, this is omitted during the Selichot season during which vidui and the Thirteen Attributes were recited right before the service; they revert to the older custom of not reciting it.

In Nusach Sefard, the order is vidui, Thirteen Attributes, nefilat apayim, "ve-hu rachum", "Hashem elokey Yisra'el", Shomer Yisra'el, and then Tachanun is concluded as normal.

In the Sephardic rite, there are two variations: The older custom (maintained by Spanish and Portuguese and some Moroccan Jews) is to recite the Thirteen Attributes, "Anshei Amanah Avadu" (on Monday) or "Tamanu me-ra'ot" (on Thursday), another Thirteen Attributes, "al ta'as imanu kalah", Vidui, "ma nomar", another Thirteen Attributes, "ve-hu rachum", nefilat apayim, "Hashem ayeh chasadech ha-rishonim" (on Monday) or "Hashem she'arit peletat Ariel" (on Thursday), and Tachnun is concluded as on other days.

Most Sephardic communities today have adopted a different order based on the Kabbalah of the Ari. This order includes vidui, "ma nomar", Thirteen Attributes, and nefilat apayim, which is concluded as every day. After this, another Thirteen Attributes, "Anshei Amanah Avadu", another Thirteen Attributes, "Tamanu me-ra'ot", another Thirteen Attributes, "al ta'as imanu kalah", and Tachnun concludes with "ve-hu rachum".

In the Italian rite, several verses from Daniel are recited - these verses are included in "ve-hu rachum" recited in other rites, but the prayer in the Italian rite is much shorter. This is followed by Thirteen Attributes, Vidui, "ma nomar", nefilat apayim, Psalm 130, a collection of verses from Jeremiah and Micah, a piyyut beginning "Zechor berit Avraham" (this is different from the famous selicha of Zechor Berit known in other rites), Psalm 20, and Tachanun is concluded as on other days.

The Yemeni liturgy did not initially include any additions for Monday and Thursday. However, due to the influence of other communities, they have adopted the following order: nefilat apayim, Thirteen Attributes, "al ta'as imanu kalah", Vidui, "ma nomar", another Thirteen Attributes, "ve-hu rachum", "Hashem ayeh chasadech ha-rishonim" (on Monday) or "Hashem she'arit peletat Ariel" (on Thursday), and Tachnun is concluded as on other days.

== History ==
The source of the supplicatory prayer (Taḥanun) is in Daniel 9:3 and 1 Kings 8:54, in which the text indicates that one's prayer should always be followed by supplication. Based on this, the Sages developed the habit of adding a personal appeal to God following the set prayers (some examples are listed in Berakhot 16b). In the fourteenth century, these spontaneous supplications were standardized and formalized as Tachanun.

The custom of bending over and resting one's head on the left hand is suggested by the name Tachanun took in the halakhic literature: nefilat apayim (lit. 'falling on [the] face'). It is also reminiscent of the Korban sacrifice brought in the Temple in Jerusalem, which was laid on its left side to be slaughtered. A person's arm should be covered with a sleeve, tallit, or other covering. This posture, developed in the post-Talmudic period, symbolizes the original practice of prostrating with their faces touching the ground to show humility and submission to God. The pose was also used by Moses and Joshua, who fell on their faces before God after the sin of the Golden calf.

Because Joshua fell on his face before the Ark of the Covenant, Ashkenazi custom is that one puts one's head down only when praying in front of a Torah ark containing a Torah scroll. Otherwise, it is proper to sit with the head up. One source says that if the synagogue's Torah ark can be seen from one's seat and has a valid Torah scroll within it, one puts one's head down during Tachanun. The same source reports a custom of in-the-next-room, and notes that it is not universally accepted. The source also states that Tachanun is said with one's head down by some in Jerusalem; in the presence of a Torah scroll outside an ark; and at home if one "knows at exactly what time the congregation recites Tachanun in the synagogue". In a different article, Rabbi Moshe Feinstein is cited as ruling that "because Jerusalem is such a holy city", it is as if one is always in the presence of a Torah scroll. He also makes a case for "in the same room" and advises, "If not, then you say it sitting without putting your head down."

The longer version of Tachanun recited on Mondays and Thursdays is sourced by classical sources (e.g., S. Baer's Siddur Avodath Yisrael) to three sages who had escaped the destruction of the Second Temple. While on a ship on the way to Europe, they were caught in a storm, and all three recited a personal prayer, after which the storm subsided. These sages went on to establish communities in Europe. David Abudirham writes that the words "rachum ve-chanun" ("merciful and gracious") mark the beginning of the next segment.

== Days on which Tachanun is omitted ==
Tachanun is omitted from the prayers on Shabbat (beginning from Friday afternoon), all the major holidays and festivals (including Chol HaMoed, the intermediate days of Pesach and Sukkot), Rosh Chodesh (new moon) starting on the afternoon of the day before, Hanukkah and Purim, as these days are of a festive nature and reciting Tachanun, which is mildly mournful, would not be appropriate.

The following is a list of all the other days, "minor holidays", when tachanun is excluded from the prayers, and Psalm 126 is recited during Birkat HaMazon. It is typically also omitted from the Mincha prayers the preceding afternoon, unless otherwise noted:

9	Tishrei	The day before Yom Kippur (but not the mincha of the day beforehand).
11–14	Tishrei	The days between Yom Kippur and Sukkot.
23–29	Tishrei	From after Simchat Torah until the conclusion of the month (universal only on isru chag, but not on the days following it).
25 - 2 or 3	Kislev-Tevet	All 8 days of Chanukah.
15	Shevat	Tu BiShvat, New Year of the Trees. Universally at Shacharit but not at mincha nor the mincha before.
14–15	Adar I	Purim Katan and Shushan Purim Katan
14–15	Adar	Purim and Shushan Purim
23–29	Adar	Shivat Yemei HaMilluim - 7 inaugural/pre-inaugural days of the Mishkan. Primarily a chasidic custom, and most communities do recite Tachnun this week. See Rashi, Lev. 9:1.
Entire month	Nisan	
14	Iyar	According to some customs, Pesach Sheni (virtually all Ashkenazic communities do not omit tachnun at the mincha of the day beforehand, but some Sephardic communities do omit at the mincha before hand; not a universal custom).
18	Iyar	Lag BaOmer Universally at Shacharit but not at mincha nor the mincha before.
1–5	Sivan	The beginning of the month until Shavuot.
7–12	Sivan	The Isru chag (universal) and compensatory week to bring an offering to the Temple in Jerusalem after Shavuot (not a universal custom).
9	Av	Tisha B'Av - Yemenite Jews do recite Tachnun on Tisha B'Av, and the original Italian rite custom (through the 19th century) was to resume the recitation of Tachanun at mincha on Tisha B'Av.
15	Av	Tu B'Av Universally at Shacharit but not at mincha nor the mincha before.
29	Elul	The day before Rosh Hashanah (but not the mincha of the day beforehand; in the Selichot in the early morning, Ashkenazim recite tachanun, but Sephardim do not).

It is also not recited in the house of a mourner (reasons vary: either so as not to add to the mourner's grief by highlighting God's judgment, or because a mourner's house is a house of judgment, and a house of judgment is not a suitable place for requesting mercy; see bereavement in Judaism), nor is it said in the presence of a groom in the sheva yemei hamishte (the seven celebratory days subsequent to his marriage; see marriage in Judaism). Additionally, Tachanun is omitted in a synagogue when a circumcision is taking place in the synagogue at that time, and when either the father of the baby, the sandek (the one who holds the baby during the circumcision), or the mohel (the one who performs the circumcision) is present.

Some Nusach Sefard communities omit Tachanun during mincha, primarily because it was common for Hasidic congregations to pray mincha after sunset, in which case some hold that Tachanun needs be omitted. Additionally, many Hasidic communities omit Tachanun on the anniversary of the death of various Rebbes (except Lubavitch makes a point of saying), since that is considered a day for religious renewal and celebration. There is a Hasidic custom of omitting Tachanun the entire week of Purim (11-17 Adar) and the entire week of Lag BaOmer (14-20 Iyar). Some Chasidic communities omit Tachanun on 7 Adar because it is the anniversary of the death of Moses. Additionally some Hasidic congregations omit Tachanun on Friday mornings (getting ready for Shabbat), and some even on Sunday mornings (revival from Shabbat).

In many congregations, it is customary to omit Tachanun on holidays established by the State of Israel: Yom Ha'atzmaut (Independence Day), 5 Iyar (most years, date changes depending on day of week); and Yom Yerushalayim (the anniversary of the reunification of Jerusalem in 1967), 28 Iyar. Some communities in the Diaspora will also omit Tachanun on civil holidays in their own country (such as Thanksgiving in the United States).
