= Mincha =

Afternoon prayer service in Judaism

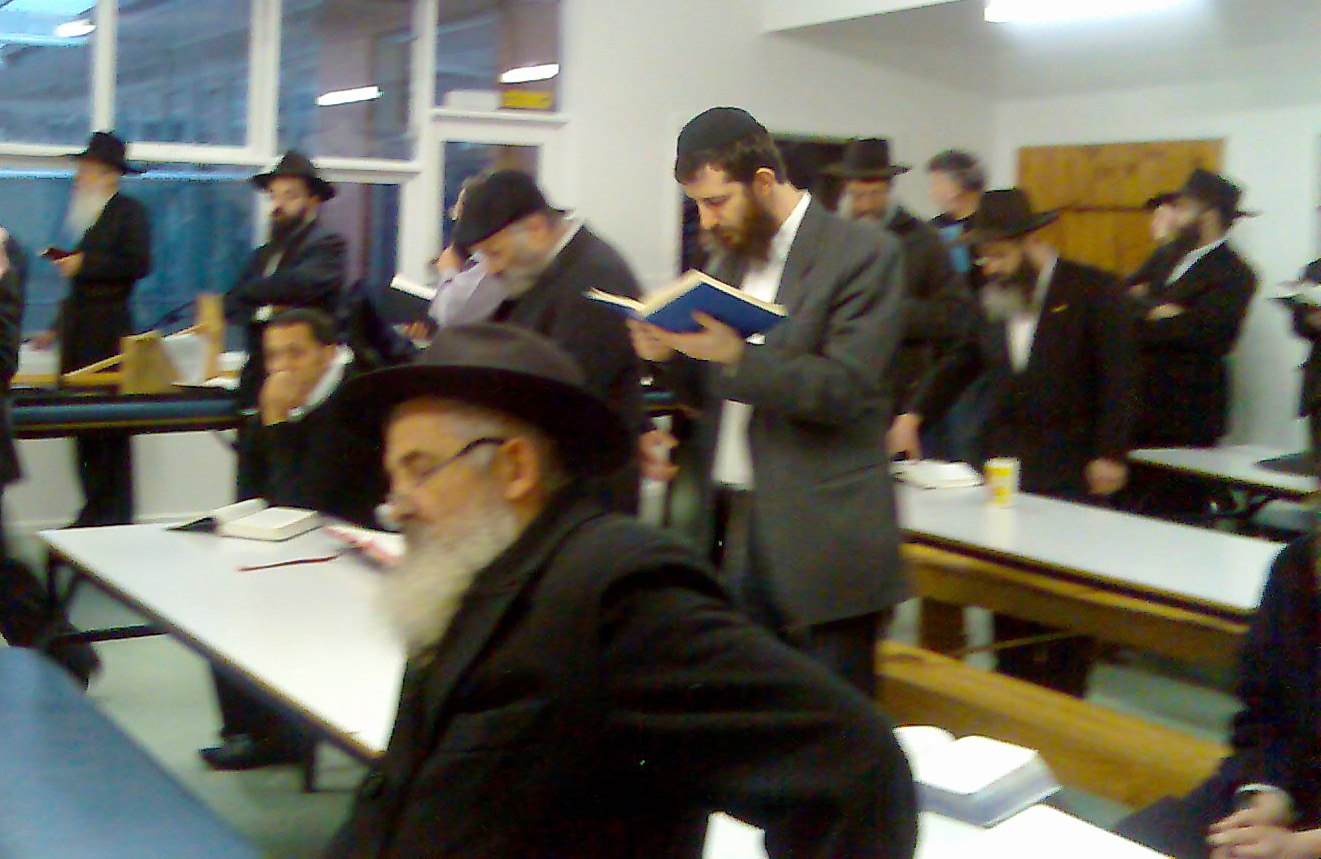
A mincha minyan (quorum of ten or more Jewish men) at a yeshiva

Mincha (Hebrew: מִנְחָה minḥa, IPA: [minˈħa]; sometimes spelled Minchah, Minhah, Mincho or Minchuh) is the afternoon prayer service in Judaism.

== Etymology ==
The name Mincha, meaning "gift" or "offering", is derived from the meal offering that accompanied each sacrifice offered in the Temple (Beit HaMikdash).

== Origin ==
The Hebrew noun minḥah (מִנְחָה) is used 211 times in the Masoretic Text of the Hebrew Bible, with the first uses referring to vegetable and animal offerings brought by Cain and Abel to God. Most other uses refer to a gift offering, made of grain, which could be offered at any time in the day. However, occasionally the Bible uses "mincha" to specifically refer to the afternoon Temple sacrifice.

Rabbis in the Talmud debate whether the daily prayers have their origin in the behavior of the biblical Patriarchs, or in the Temple sacrifices. According to the first opinion, the Mincha prayer was originated by Isaac, who "went out to converse in the field", with God. According to the second opinion, the Mincha prayer is based on the afternoon tamid (daily) offering which was offered in the Temple each afternoon.

== Time frame for recitation ==
Mincha is different from Shacharit and Maariv in that it is recited in the middle of the secular day. Unlike Shacharit, which is recited upon arising, and Maariv, which can be recited before going to sleep, Mincha is the afternoon prayer, and as a result of this, many Mincha groups have formed in workplaces and other places where many Jews are present during the day.

Mincha may be recited beginning half an hour (either regular or relative hours) after halachic noontime. This earliest time is referred to as mincha gedola ("large mincha"). According to the Shulchan Aruch, it is preferably recited after mincha ketana ("small mincha", 2.5 halachic hours before sunset or nightfall), but common practice is to recite it anytime after mincha gedola and not to be careful to recite it specifically after mincha ketana.

The name "large mincha" may come from the fact that more of the day remains than in "small mincha".

Ideally, one should complete Mincha before sunset (shkiah), although many authorities permit reciting Mincha until nightfall. The Mishnah Berurah states that is preferable to recite mincha without a minyan before shkiah than to recite it with a minyan after shkia.

== Prayers ==
Mincha on a weekday exclusively includes prayers found at Shacharit.

Prayers of Mincha include the following:

- Ashrei
- Uva Letzion (on Shabbat and Yom Tov only, in Italian Nusach also on fast days)
- Torah reading (on Shabbat and public fast days only)
- Amidah (in some communities, it includes slight variations from Shacharis) Like in Shacharit, it is generally recited silently and then repeated by the Chazzan.
- Avinu Malkeinu (on Ten Days of Repentance only, and in some communities also on public fast days; omitted on occasions when Tachanun is omitted)
- Tachanun (omitted on Shabbat, Yom Tov, and certain other festive days)
- Tzidkatcha (on Shabbat only; omitted on days when Tachanun would be omitted if it were a weekday)
- In the Sephardic rite (and in some Chasidic communities), a Psalm is recited here: generally, Psalm 67 on weekdays, Psalm 93 on Friday and Psalm 112 on the sabbath.
- Aleinu - In some Ashkenazic communities, this is omitted if followed immediately by Maariv. In the Italian Nusach and Baladi rite, this is never recited at Mincha; in the modern Italian Nusach (although this is a relatively late addition), Psalm of the day or Psalm 67 is recited instead.

Most Sephardim and Italian Jews start the Mincha prayers with Psalm 84 and Korbanot (Numbers 28:1–8), and usually continue with the Pittum hakketoret. The opening section is concluded with Malachi 3:4. Most non-Chasidic Ashkenizim begin with Ashrei, although many individuals recite the Korban HaTamid beforehand (a very few Nusach Ashkenaz communities have adopted the practice to recite Korban HaTamid (Numbers 28:1–8) publicly).

On Yom Kippur, Ashkenazim postpone Ashrei and Uva Letzion until the Ne'ila service.

== See also ==
- Asr
- Mandaean prayer at noontime
- Mussaf
