= Tishrei =

7th month of the Hebrew calendar

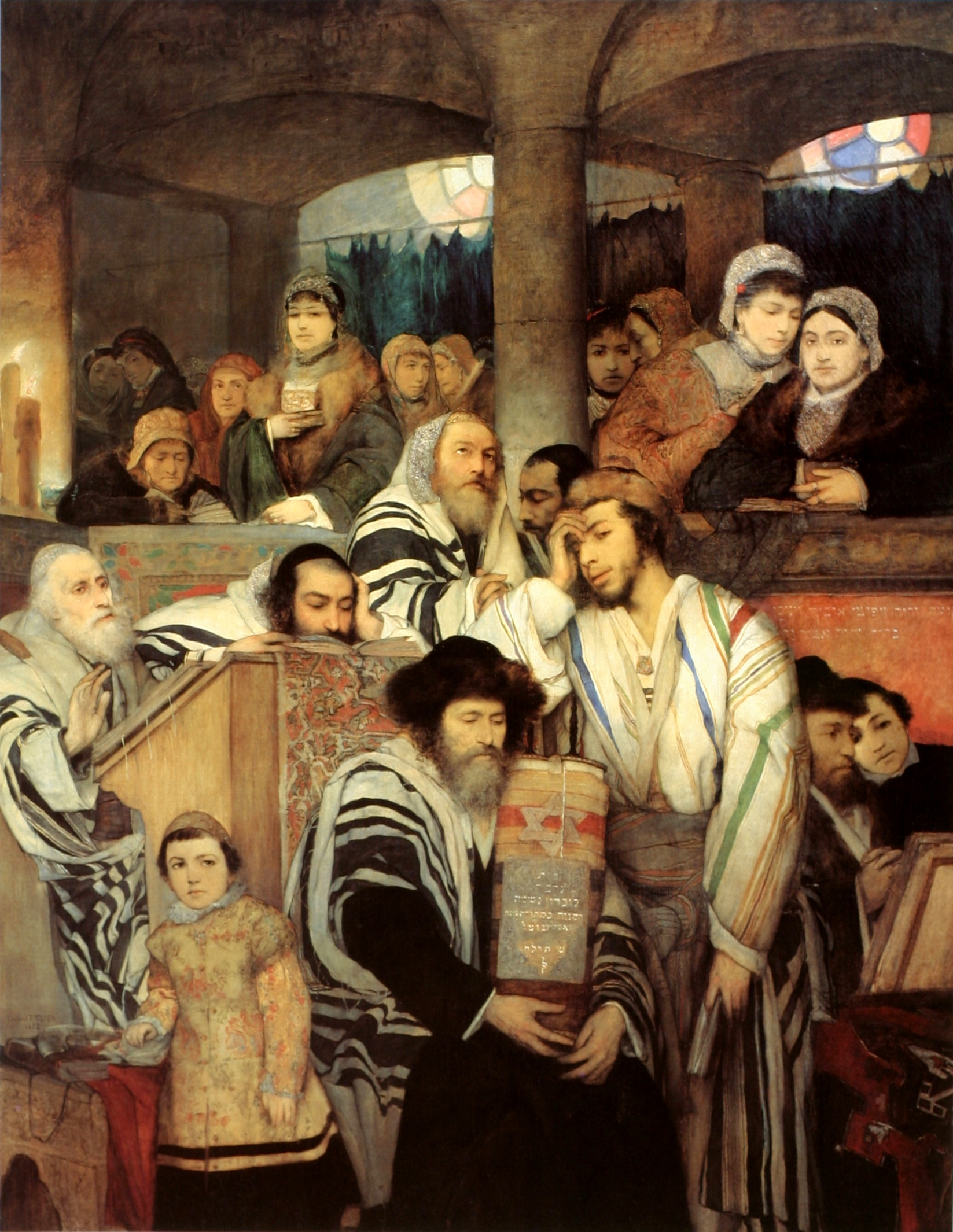
- The holiest day of the Jewish calendar, Yom Kippur, the Day of Atonement, takes place on the 10th of Tishrei.
- Native name: תִּשְׁרֵי (Hebrew)
- Calendar: Hebrew calendar
- Month number: 7
- Number of days: 30
- Season: Autumn (Northern Hemisphere)
- Gregorian equivalent: September–October
- Significant days: Rosh Hashanah; Fast of Gedalia; Yom Kippur; Sukkot; Hoshanah Rabbah; Shemini Atzeret; Simchat Torah

Tishrei (/ˈtɪʃreɪ/; Hebrew: תִּשְׁרֵי [tiʃˈʁej]) or Tishri (/ˈtɪʃriː/; תִּשְׁרִי [tiʃˈɾi]; from Akkadian tašrītu 'beginning') is the first month of the civil year (which starts on 1 Tishrei) and the seventh month of the ecclesiastical year (which starts on 1 Nisan) in the Hebrew calendar. It is a month of 30 days. Tishrei usually occurs in September–October on the Gregorian calendar.

In the Hebrew Bible the month is called Ethanim (Hebrew: אֵתָנִים – 1 Kings 8:2), or simply the seventh month. In the Babylonian calendar the month is known as Araḫ Tišritum, "Month of Beginning" (of the second half-year).

Edwin R. Thiele has concluded, in The Mysterious Numbers of the Hebrew Kings, that the ancient Kingdom of Judah counted years using the civil year starting in Tishrei, while the Kingdom of Israel counted years using the ecclesiastical new year starting in Nisan. Tishrei is the month used for the counting of the epoch year – i.e., the count of the year is incremented on 1 Tishrei. Rabbinical scholar Allan M. Langer suggested that the shift away from an agricultural economy to a more mercantile one in post-Biblical times led to Tishrei being favored as the first month of the year over Nisan.

== Holidays ==
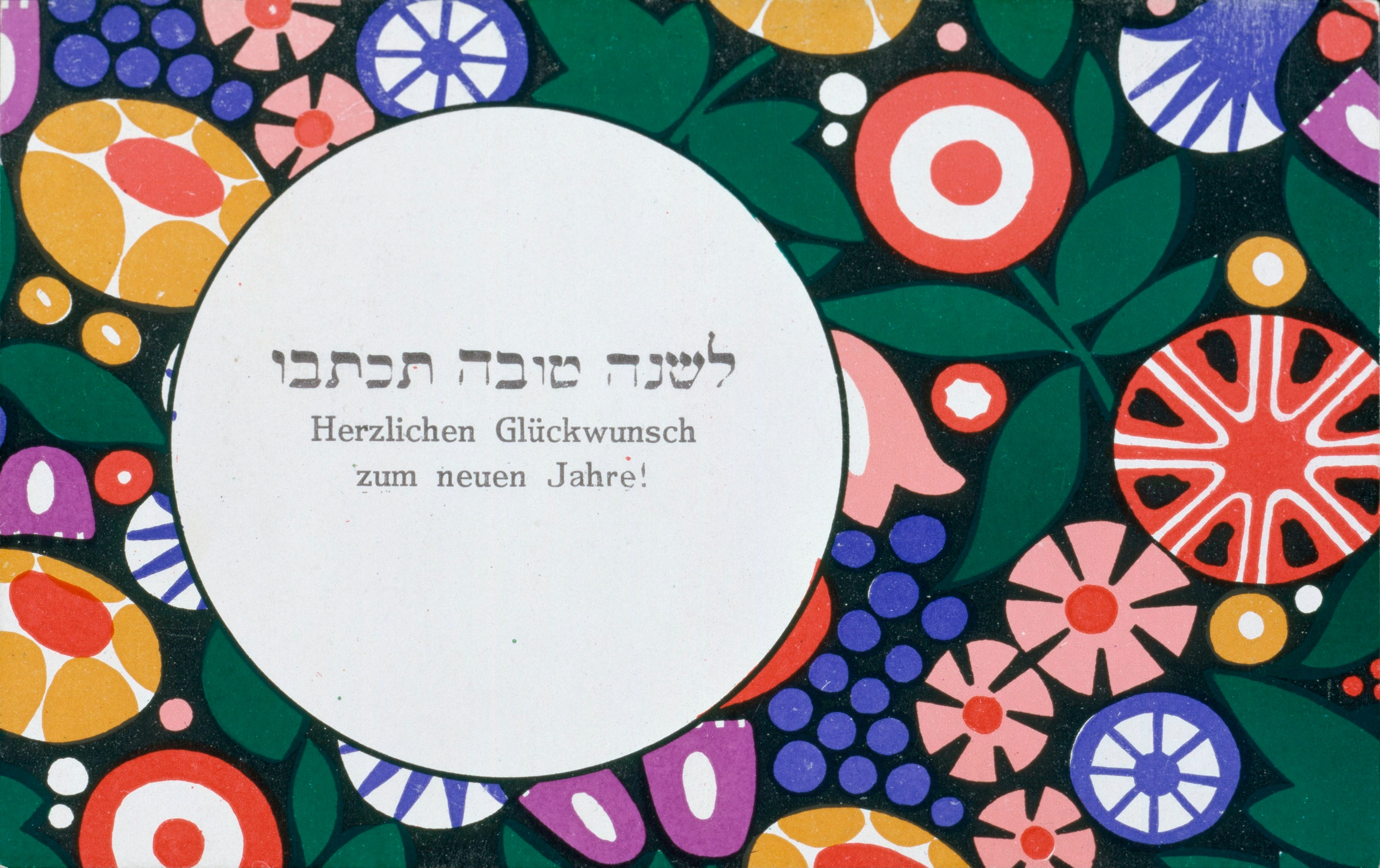
Rosh Hashanah greeting card, 1910

- 1–2 Tishrei – Rosh Hashanah
- 3 Tishrei – Tzom Gedaliah – (Fast Day) – On Tishrei 4 when Tishrei 3 is Shabbat
- 9 Tishrei – Erev Yom Kippur
- 10 Tishrei – Yom Kippur – (Fast Day)
- 15–21 Tishrei – Sukkot/Sukkos
- 21 Tishrei – Hoshanah Rabbah
- 22 Tishrei (and 23 outside Israel) – Shemini Atzeret/Atzeres & Simchat Torah/Simchas Torah

== In Jewish history and tradition ==
- 1 Tishrei (c. 3760 BCE) – Adam and Eve were created, according to one opinion in the Talmud.
- 1 Tishrei (1923) – Daf Yomi study regimen is launched.
- 2 Tishrei (1659) – HaRav Tuvya and HaRav Yisroel were murdered in a blood libel in Razino.
- 3 Tishrei (c. 582 BCE) – Assassination of Gedaliah; now a fast day.
- 4 Tishrei (1683) – King Louis XIV expelled the Jews from all French territories in America.
- 5 Tishrei (135 CE) – Rabbi Akiva is arrested.
- 6 Tishrei (1939) – The German Wehrmacht murdered 100 Jews in Lukov, Poland (now Łuków) during the Nazi invasion of Poland.
- 7 Tishrei (c. 1313 BCE) – Taanit tzaddikim (Orach Chaim 5580:2) commemorating God's decree that the Dor Hamidbar died in the wilderness because of the sin of the Eigel HaZahav / Golden Calf (according to some, (Kol Bo and others), the event took place one day earlier, on 6 Tishrei).
- 8 Tishrei (c. 946 BCE) – 14-day dedication of Solomon's Temple begins.
- 9 Tishrei (123 CE) – Death of the Tanna R' Elazar ben Rab' Shimon.
- 10 Tishrei (c. 1313 BCE) – Moses returns from a final trip to Mount Sinai, bearing a second set of tablets and a message of forgiveness for the Golden Calf.
- 10 Tishrei (1973) – The armies of Egypt, Syria, and other Arab states attack Israeli positions in the Sinai and Golan Heights, beginning the Yom Kippur War.
- 11 Tishrei – The Baal Shem Tov wrote that the day after Yom Kippur is an even greater holiday than Yom Kippur itself, a day called "Bshem HaShem" or in Yiddish "Gott's Nomen", literally "The Name of God".
- 13 Tishrei (1882) - Passing of the Rebbe Maharash, the 4th Chabad Rebbe.
- 16 Tishrei (1349) – The Jewish population of Krems, Germany, was massacred in the Black Death riots.
- 18 Tishrei (1810) – Death of Rabbi Nachman of Breslov
- 22 Tishrei (2023) - Hamas, alongside several other Palestinian militias, launched the 2023 Hamas-led attack on Israel, starting the Gaza war.
- 25 Tishrei (1809) – Death of Rabbi Levi Yitzchok of Berditchev

== See also ==
- Tishrīn (Arabic: تشرين) is the name of two Gregorian months in the Levant:
  - Tishrīn al-Awwal (Arabic: تشرين الأول, literally "First Tishrin"): October. The 1973 Yom Kippur War is generally known by the name Ḥarb Tishrīn ("October War") in Syria and Lebanon, and among the Palestinians, following the Arab custom of naming the Arab-Israeli wars by months or years.
  - Tishrīn al-Thāni (Arabic: تشرين الثاني, literally "Second Tishrin"): November.

== Bibliography ==
Langer, Allan M. (2012). ""The history of the Tishrei conundrum"". The Jewish Bible Quarterly. 40 (2): 131–134.
