= Shacharit =

Jewish morning prayer

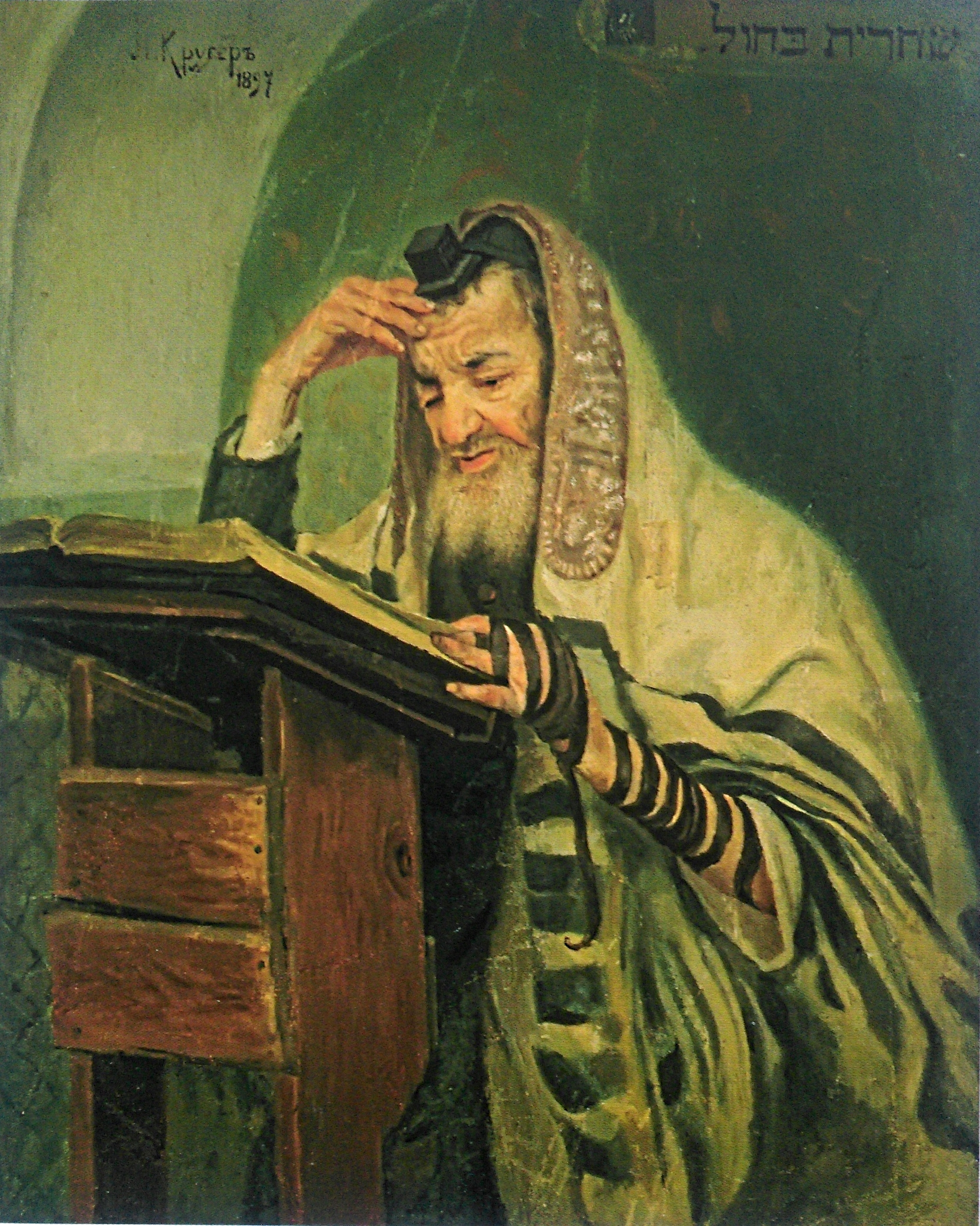
Jankiel Kruhier: Shacharit B'chol (Weekday Shacharit), Minsk 1897

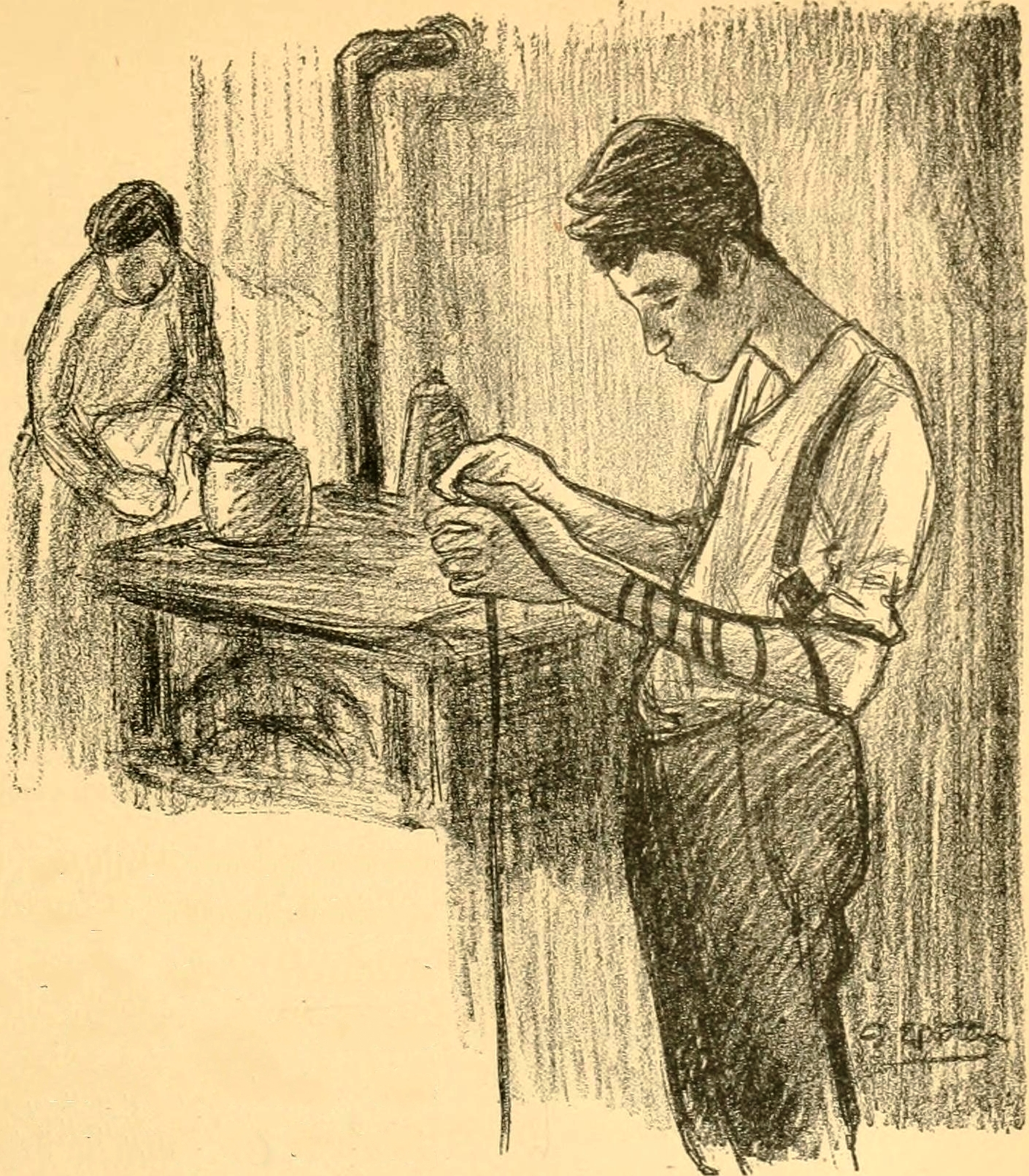
Jacob Epstein: "The spirit of the Ghetto" - Morning prayer, Jewish quarter in New York 1902

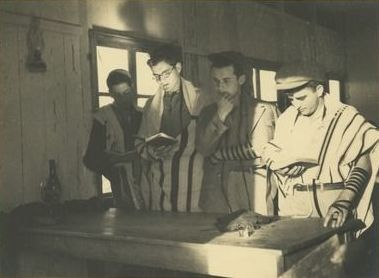
Shacharit, Kvutzat Yavne 1930s

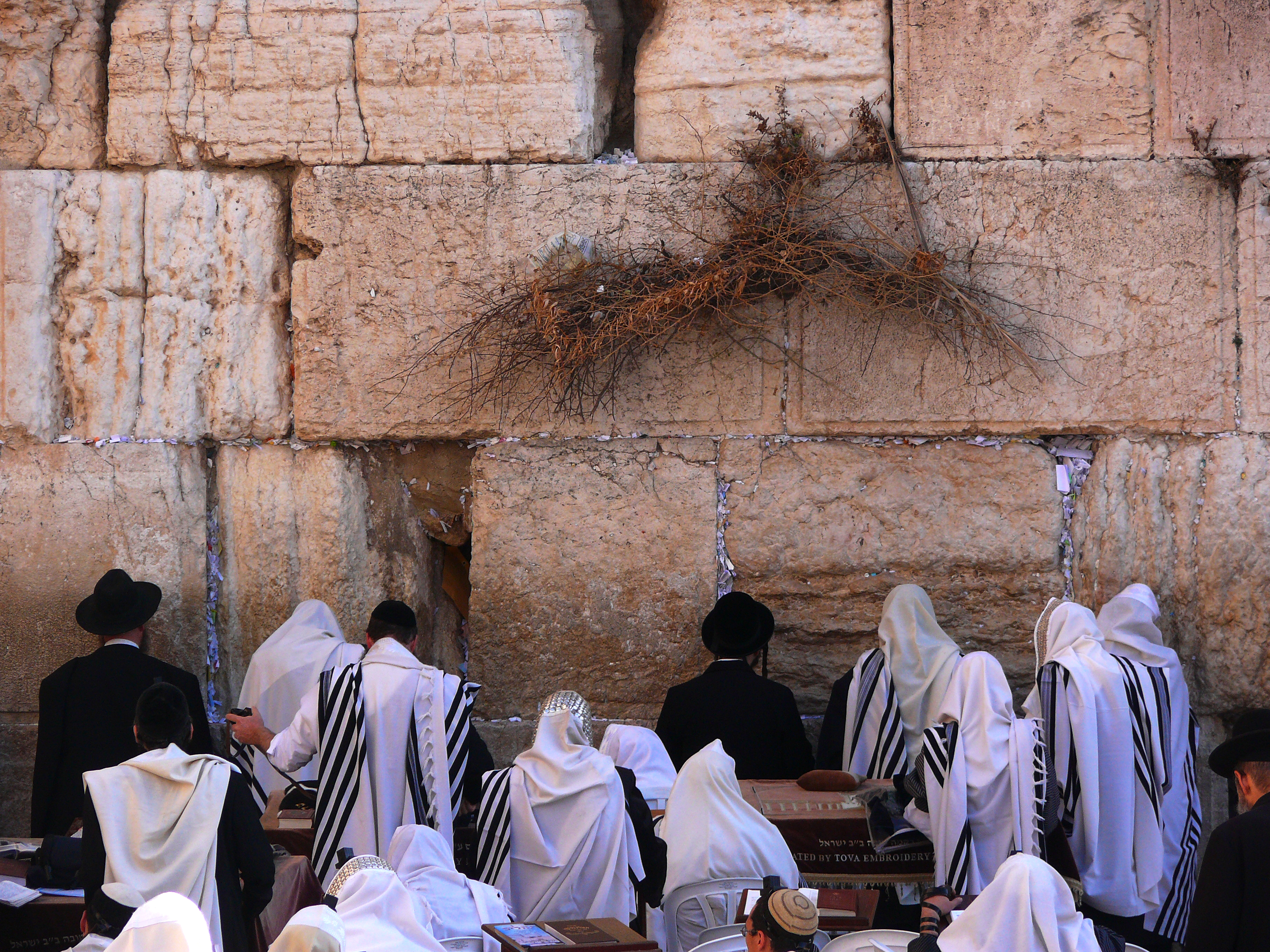
Shacharit at the Western Wall, 2010

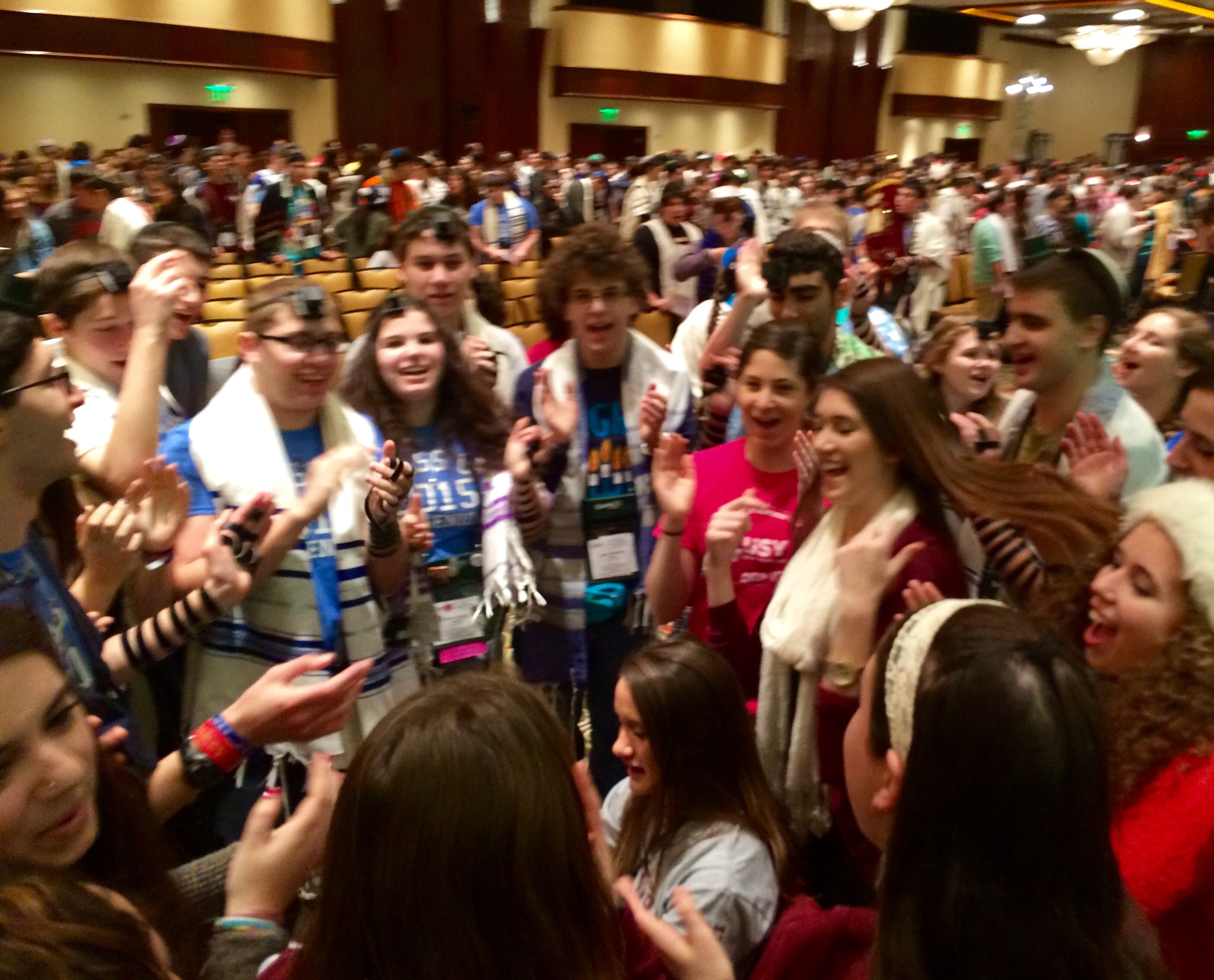
USY International Convention participants pray together during Shacharit Live

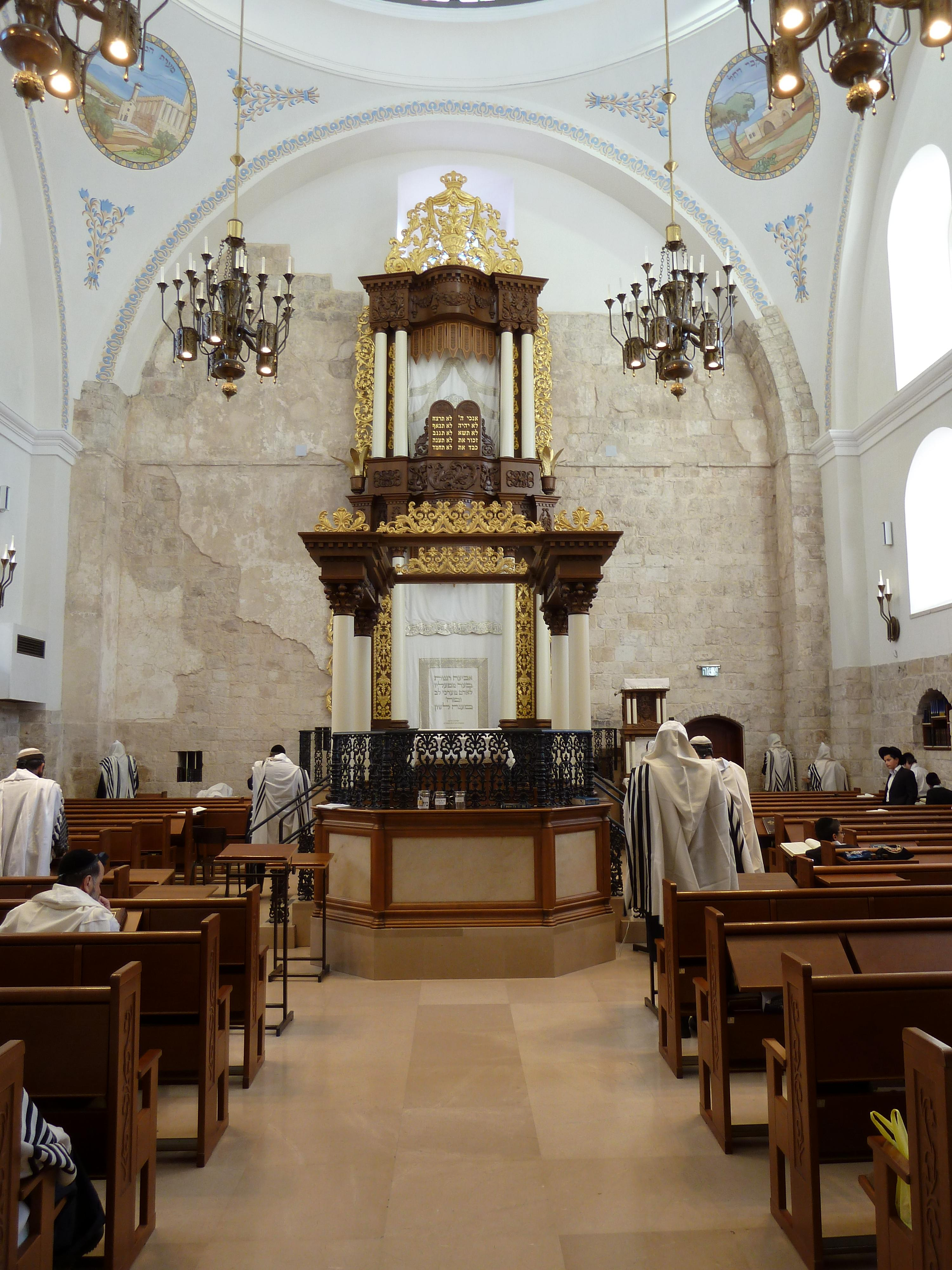
Shacharit, Hurva Synagogue, Jerusalem 2012

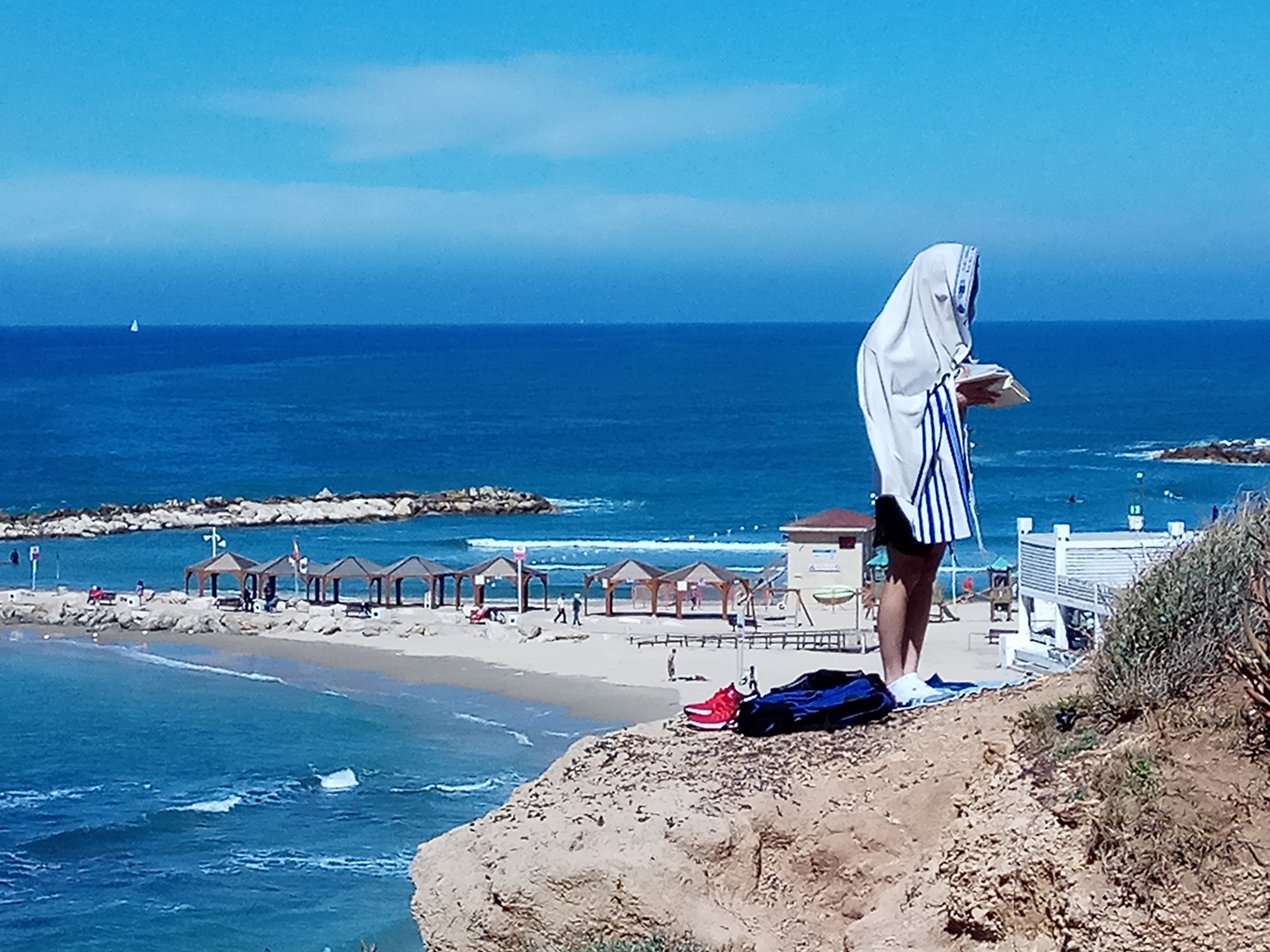
Shacharit on Tel Aviv beach 2018

Shacharit [ʃaχaˈʁit] (Hebrew: שַחֲרִית šaḥăriṯ), or Shacharis in Ashkenazi Hebrew, is the morning tefillah (prayer) of Judaism, one of the three daily prayers.

Different traditions identify different primary components of Shacharit. Essentially all agree that pesukei dezimra, the Shema and its blessings, and the Amidah are major sections. Some identify the preliminary blessings and readings, as a first, distinct section. Others say that Tachanun is a separate section, as well as the concluding blessings. On certain days, there are additional prayers and services added to shacharit, including Mussaf and a Torah reading.

== Etymology ==
Shacharit comes from the Hebrew root שחר (shaħar), meaning dawn.

== Origin ==
According to tradition, Shacharit was identified as a time of prayer by Abraham, as Genesis 19:27 states, "Abraham arose early in the morning," which traditionally is the first Shacharit. However, Abraham's prayer did not become a standardized prayer.

Shacharit was also instituted in part as a replacement of the daily morning Temple service after the destruction of the Temple. The sages of the Great Assembly may have formulated blessings and prayers that later became part of Shacharit, however the siddur, or prayerbook as we know it, was not fully formed until around the 7th century CE. The prayers said still vary among congregations and Jewish communities.

== Service ==
=== Weekdays ===
During or before Shacharit, those Jews who wear tallit or tefillin put them on, in each case accompanied by blessings. Some do not eat until they have prayed.

The main components of Shacharit are:

- Birkot hashachar, a series of blessings originally recited upon arising, now incorporated into the prayer service.
- Korbanot, a series of recitations related to the Temple sacrifices.
- Pesukei dezimra, a series of psalms, hymns, and prayers. Pesukei dezimra is said so that an individual will have praised God before making requests, which might be considered rude.
- The Shema Yisrael and its related blessings. One should "concentrate on fulfilling the positive commandment of reciting the Shema" before reciting it. One should be sure to say it clearly and not to slur words together.
- Amidah (Shemoneh Esreh), a series of 19 blessings. The blessings cover a variety of topics such as Jerusalem, crops, and prayer.
- Tachanun, a supplication consisting of a collection of passages from the Hebrew Bible (Tanakh). A longer version is recited on Mondays and Thursdays. Tachanun is omitted on holidays and other celebratory days on the civil calendar.
- On certain holidays, Hallel is recited.
- Torah reading (on certain days)
- Ashrei and Uva letzion
- Aleinu and Shir shel yom

Kaddish is recited between most of the above sections.

=== Shabbat and holidays ===
Various changes to the Shacharit service take place on Shabbat and holidays:

- In Pesukei dezimra, most communities omit Psalm 100 (Mizmor LeTodah, the psalm for the thanksgiving offering), because the todah or thanksgiving offering could not be offered on Shabbat in the days of the Temple in Jerusalem. Its place is taken in the Ashkenazi tradition by Psalms 19, 34, 90, 91, 135, 136, 33, 92, 93. Sephardic Jews maintain a different order, add several psalms and two religious poems.
- The Nishmat prayer is recited at the end of the Pesukei D'Zimrah, as an expansion of the weekday Yishtabah blessing.
- The blessings before Shema are expanded, and include the hymn El Adon, which is often sung communally.
- The intermediate 13 blessings of the Amidah are replaced by a single blessing on the topic of Shabbat or the holiday. In Nusach Ashkenaz (and Nusach Sefard) the Kedushah (recited during the Hazzan's repetition of the third Amidah blessing) is significantly expanded; in the Sephardic rite, it is recited in the same form as on weekdays.
- After the repetition is concluded, some recite the Shir shel yom (others recite it at the end of the Mussaf service)
- A Torah reading always takes place on Shabbat and holidays. In the Eastern Ashkenazic rite, the prayers surrounding the reading are much longer than on weekdays, but in the Western Ashkenazic rite, they are almost identical. The weekly portion is read, divided into at least seven Aliyot (plus a "maftir" Aliyah), followed by the haftarah.
- In Nusach Ashkenaz (and Nusach Sefard), prayers for the community are recited after the Torah reading: Yekum Purkan, as well as the subsequent Mi sheberakh, a blessing for the leaders and patrons of the synagogue. In the Western Ashkenazic rite, the Mi sheberakh is omitted on the Shabbat before Rosh Chodesh.
- In some communities, prayers are then recited for the government of the country, for peace, and/or for the State of Israel. On the Shabbat before Rosh Chodesh (Shabbat mevorchim) a special prayer blessing the new month is recited.
- After these prayers, Ashrei is repeated and the Torah scroll is returned to the Ark in a procession through the Synagogue. Many congregations allow children to come to the front in order to kiss the scroll as it passes.

This is followed by the Mussaf service, which generally is recited immediately after Shacharit.

== Timing ==
According to Jewish law, the earliest time to recite the morning service is when there is enough natural light "one can see a familiar acquaintance six feet away." It is a subjective standard. The usual time for this prayer service is between sunrise and a third of the day. If one missed a third of the day, it may be recited until astronomical noon, referred to as chatzot. After that (technically, half an hour after chatzot), the afternoon service (mincha) can be recited.

== See also ==
- Mandaean prayer at dawn
- Fajr
- List of Jewish prayers and blessings
- Suhur
