= Ellul =

Maltese surname

Ellul is a Maltese surname.

Originally spelt Hellul, the first records of the name in Malta were found on the Militia Roster of Watch Duties (1417) and the Island Militia List of 1419-1420 with individuals: Luca Hellul (Casali Dragu, Gazara et Maritatu), Paulu Hellul (Casali Bise et Dimag), Antoni Hellule (Gozo), Fidericu Hellul (Wied iż-Żurrieq and Għar Lapsi), Lippu Hellul (Marsaskala and St. Thomas Bay) bearing it as a surname and Xellule Fandar (Mdina) bearing it as a given name, with all recorded individuals belonging strictly to rural Catholic peasant families. A possible variant of the name was recorded in Calatatrasi, Sicily in 1178 (Allūn ibn Bādīs, Siculo-Arabic: علون بن باديس) as a given name.

Notable people with the surname include:

- Andy Ellul (born 1975), Maltese politician
- Anthony Ellul (born August 1966), Maltese judge
- Jacques Ellul (1912–1994), French (Maltese heritage) philosopher, sociologist, theologian, and Christian anarchist
- Massimo Ellul (born 1970), Maltese businessman
- Emanuel Ellul, Maltese economist
- Salvatore Ellul, Maltese architect
- Mattias Ellul, Maltese footballer
- Matthew Ellul, Maltese footballer

== See also ==
- Elul (month)
