= Jewish New Years =

Four days in the Hebrew calendar that mark a New Year according to Jewish tradition

In Jewish tradition, four different New Year dates are observed. Each delineates the beginning of a year for different legal or religious purposes. According to the Mishnah, these New Years are Rosh Hashanah (the first of Tishrei), the first of Nisan (when the Exodus began), the first of Elul, and Tu BiShvat (the fifteenth of Shevat). The Talmudic distinctions among the New Years are discussed in tractate Rosh Hashanah.

Tractate Rosh Hashanah opens with a basic description of these four New Years:

They are four New Year. On the first of Nisan is the New Year for kings and for the Festivals. On the first of Elul is the New Year for animal tithes; Rabbi Elazar and Rabbi Shimon say: on the first of Tishrei. On the first of Tishrei is the New Year for years, for Sabbatical Years and Jubilee Years, for planting, and for vegetables. On the first of Shevat is the New Year for the tree, in accordance with the statement of Beit Shamai; Beit Hillel say: on the fifteenth of Shevat.

== 1 Nisan ==
The first of the lunar month Nisan (which usually corresponds to the months March–April in the Gregorian calendar) is the beginning of the ecclesiastical year; the months are numbered beginning with Nisan. It marks the start of the year for the Three Pilgrimage Festivals. Its injunction is expressly stated in the Hebrew Bible: "This month shall be unto you the beginning of months" (Exodus 12:2). Their injunction is expressly stated in the Hebrew Bible: "Three times in the year you shall keep a feast unto me... the feast of unleavened bread (Passover)... the feast of harvest (Shavuot)... and the feast of ingathering (Sukkot) which is at the departing of the year" (Exodus 23:14–16). "At the departing of the year" implies that the new year begins here according to the Babylonian Talmud. It is also when a new year is added to the reign of Jewish kings.

== Rosh Hashanah LeMa'aser Behemah ==
Rosh Hashanah LeMa'sar Behemah is the new year for animals, starting the religious taxation period for tithing animals in biblical times. One rabbinic opinion states that the day is on the first of Elul, however halakha follows the second opinion that it coincides with Rosh Hashanah itself, in the following month, on the first of Tishrei. Elul corresponds to the Gregorian August/September, after the spring birthings, when counting the number of animals in herds was relatively simple.

== Rosh Hashanah ==
Rosh Hashanah is the new year for calculating ordinary calendar years, Sabbatical years, Jubilee years, and dates inscribed on legal deeds and contracts. Rosh Hashanah commemorates the creation of humankind. Tishrei corresponds to September/October in the Gregorian calendar.

== Tu BiShvat ==
Tu BiShvat is the new year for trees, marking the religious taxation period for tithing fruits and nuts from trees. The month of Shevat corresponds to the Gregorian January/February, the end of the Mediterranean wet season when most of the year's rainfall had occurred. Taking fruit or nuts from a tree younger than three years old, with the birthday counted as Tu Bishvat, was prohibited.
