= Rosh Hashanah LeMa'sar Behemah =

Jewish new year for tithing domesticated animals

Rosh Hashanah LaBehemah
- Official name: Hebrew: ראש השנה לבהמה; English: New Year for (Domesticated) Animals
- Observed by: Jews in Judaism
- Type: Jewish
- Significance: Tithing domestic animals
- Date: 1st of Elul or 1st of Tishrei (different opinions)
- Frequency: annual
- Related to: Jewish New Years

Rosh Hashanah L'Ma'sar Behemah (Hebrew: ראש השנה למעשר בהמה "New Year for Tithing Animals") or Rosh Hashanah LaBehemah (Hebrew: ראש השנה לבהמה "New Year for (Domesticated) Animals") is one of the four New Year's day festivals (Rashei Hashanah) in the Jewish calendar as indicated in the Mishnah. During the time of the Temple, this was a day on which shepherds determined which of their mature animals were to be tithed. According to the first opinion, the day coincides with Rosh Chodesh Elul, the New Moon for the month of Elul, exactly one month before Rosh Hashanah. However, the halacha follows the second opinion that the day coincides with Rosh Hashanah itself.

Beginning in 2009, the festival began to be revived by religious Jewish animal protection advocates and environmental educators to raise awareness of the mitzvah of tza'ar ba'alei chayim, the source texts informing Jewish ethical relationships with domesticated animals, and the lived experience of animals impacted by human needs, especially in the industrial meat industry.

== Origin ==
The Mishnah in Seder Moed Rosh Hashanah 1:1 indicates there are four New Year's Day festivals (Rosh Hashanot) that take place over the course of the year. According to the first opinion, "The first of Elul is the Rosh HaShanah for tithing behemah (domesticated animals)." The second opinion there holds that the festival occurs on the first of the month of Tishrei, and the halacha follows this opinion. This disagreement is explained in the Babylonian Talmud Rosh Hashanah 8a as a difference of opinion between Rabbi Meir, who holds that the animals conceive in the month of Adar, and Rabbi Elazar and Rabbi Shimon, who hold that the animals conceive in the month of Nissan and give birth in Elul.

== Ritual ==
In the Temple era, the tithing of the animals on Rosh Hashanah L'Ma'sar Behemah occurred by means of passing animals through a narrow opening in a pen where every tenth animal was marked with red paint.

== Modern revival ==
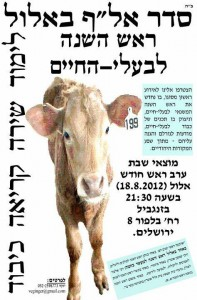
A poster advertising a communal seder for Rosh Hashanah LaBehemah in Jerusalem at Ginger House in 2012.

Informal celebrations of Rosh Hashanah LaBehemah began in 2009 at the goat barn of Adamah Farm on the campus of the Isabella Freedman Jewish Retreat Center, including a blessing of assembled farm and pet animals, and a meditation on beginning the period of cheshbon hanefesh with a personal accounting of all the domesticated animals relied upon, followed by the shofar blast for Rosh Chodesh Elul. Activists have reached out to synagogues and Jewish food, environment, and animal protection organizations, in order to raise the profile of the festival and raise awareness for the conditions of domesticated animals in contemporary society in Jewish communities. In 2012, the first guided ritual communal meals for Rosh Hashanah LaBehemah were held at the Ginger House in Jerusalem, and in major cities across the United States. Several prominent Masorti and Open Orthodox rabbis have since lent their support for reviving the festival, including Adam Frank, Yitz Greenberg, Jonathan Wittenberg, David Wolpe, and Shmuly Yanklowitz.

== Rosh Chodesh Elul ==
According to the first opinion in the Mishnah, Rosh Hashanah L'Ma'sar Behemah coincides with Rosh Ḥodesh Elul.

Commencing the first of Elul (and continuing throughout the month), in the Ashkenazic tradition, the shofar is blown at the end of the shacharit morning service (and in some communities, at Mincha as will) in anticipation of Rosh Hashanah.

The period of cheshbon hanefesh (the traditional accounting for one's relationships during the month of Elul) begins on this day. (This period of self-reflection and relationship repair is also commonly referred to as Elul Zman, the Elul season.)
