= May we be the head and not the tail =

Rosh Hashanah (Jewish New Year) saying

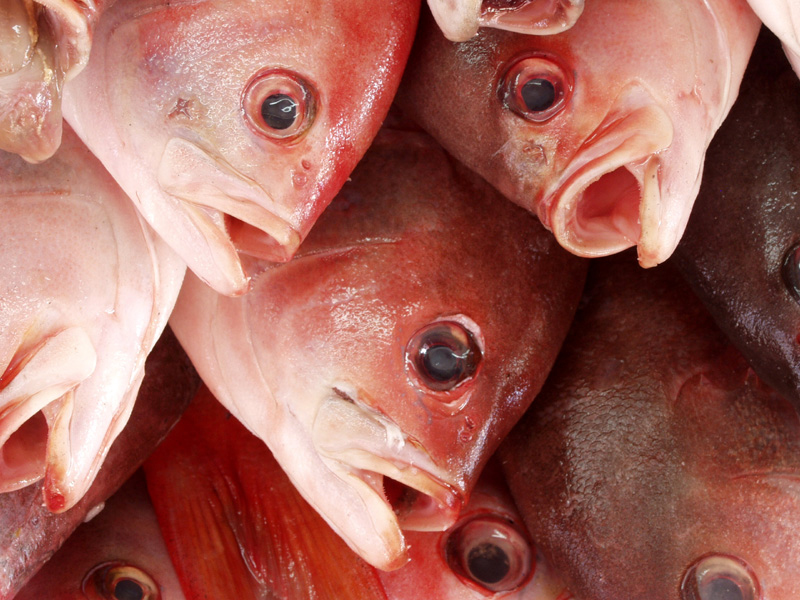
Fish heads that are usually eaten as part of Rosh Hashanah signs.

May we be the head and not the tail (ShNihiye LeRosh VeLo LeZanav, "שנהיה לראש ולא לזנב") is a traditional request associated with eating a sheep's or fish head as part of the Rosh Hashanah (Jewish New Year) symbolic foods.

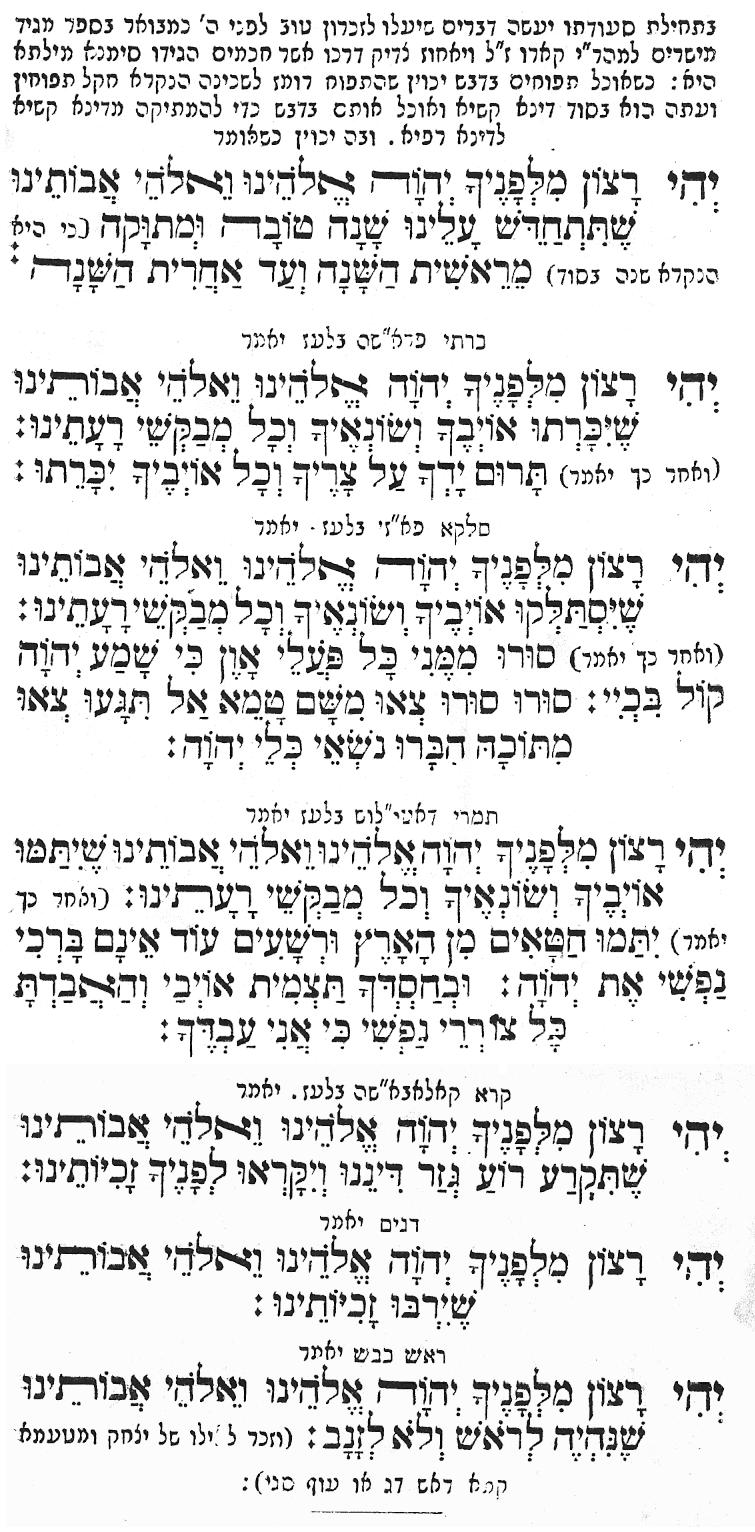
Rosh Hashanah seder

== Origin ==
The custom's roots can be traced back to Rav Netronai Gaon. It is prominently featured in the Maharil's book, which states:

Rabbi Jacob Moelin (Maharil) taught that it is a mitzvah to eat the head of a male ram on the night of Rosh Hashanah in remembrance of the Binding of Isaac, and so that we may be the head and not the tail. He used to eat the head meat with honey.

Later texts, such as the Chayei Adam, introduce the option of eating a fish head. While this lacks the symbolic connection to the Binding of Isaac, it still carries the request to be "the head and not the tail". It's worth noting that according to the Ben Ish Chai, one should not use a goat's head as a symbol on Rosh Hashanah.

The phrase "that we may be the head and not the tail" originates from a verse in the blessings section of the Ki Tavo Torah portion: "And the Lord will make you the head and not the tail".

== Interpretation ==
The straightforward interpretation, as explained by Ramban (Nachmanides) in his Torah commentary, is that the people of Israel should be at the forefront of nations and not subjugated to others:

For it is possible to be the head over many nations and the tail to one nation more honorable than it.

Furthermore, it expresses the hope that Israel will be the head from now on and will not become the tail in the future.

Netziv, in his commentary Ha'amek Davar, offers a nuanced interpretation. He suggests that while it's natural for each nation to have some advantage over others, the blessing "and not the tail" means that the people of Israel should not be inferior to other nations in any aspect.

Various homiletic interpretations have been proposed. One notable example, brought by Rabbi Yissachar Shlomo Teichtal in the name of Rabbi Ben-Zion Yadler, suggests that there are situations where Jewish communities are led by those who deserve to be the "tail" (followers rather than leaders). Therefore, the request is to be led by those truly worthy of being "heads" of the community, rather than falling under the influence of unworthy leaders who, despite their positions, are more suited to be followers.
