= Rosh Hashanah (tractate) =

Tractate in Moed

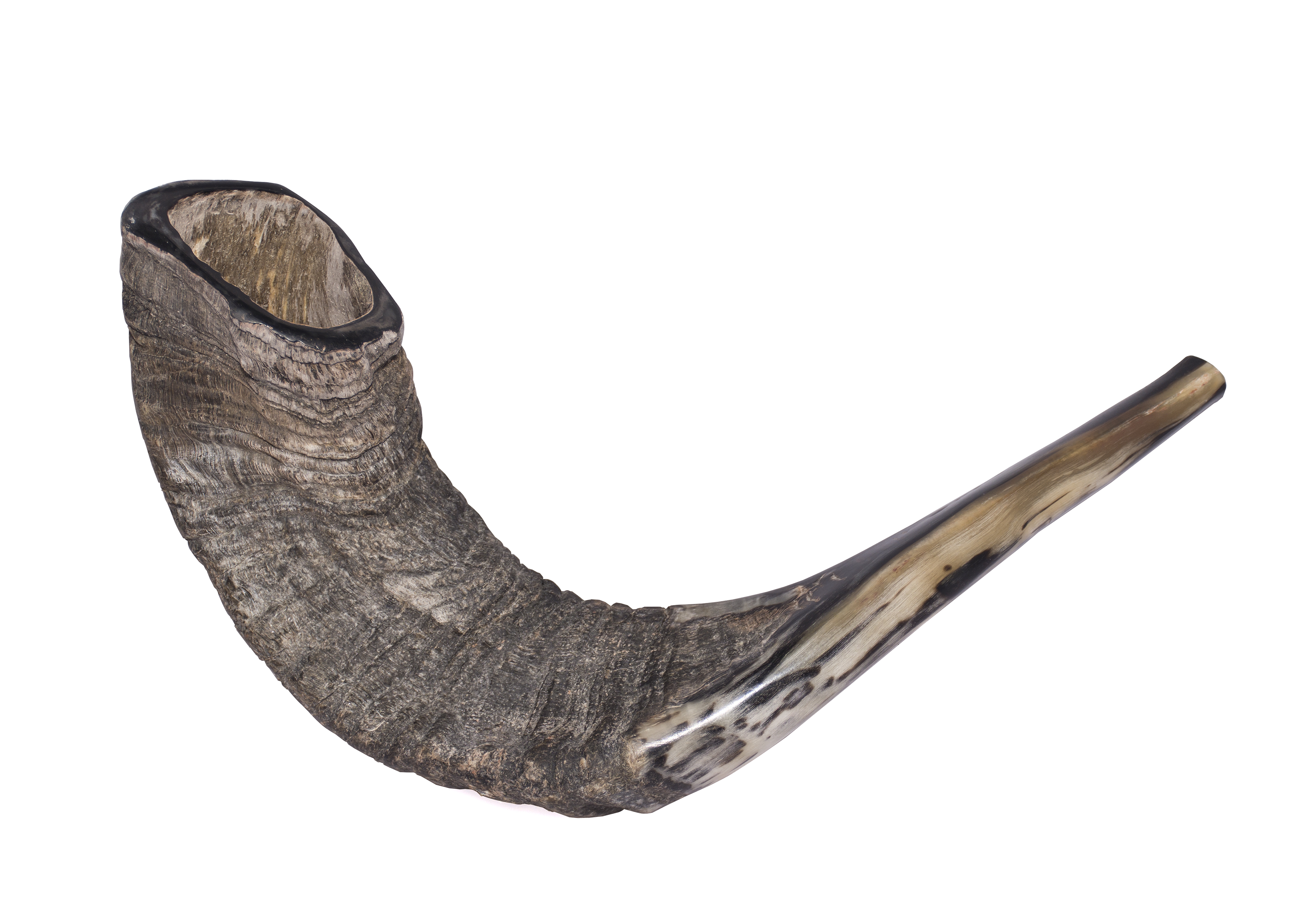
- A shofar, symbol of the Rosh Hashanah holiday

Tractate of the Talmud
- Seder: Moed
- Number of mishnahs: 35
- Chapters: 4
- Babylonian Talmud pages: 35
- Jerusalem Talmud pages: 22
- Tosefta chapters: 2

Rosh Hashanah (Hebrew: רֹאשׁ הַשָּׁנָה) is the name of a text of Jewish law originating in the Mishnah which formed the basis of tractates in both the Babylonian Talmud and the Jerusalem Talmud of the same name. It is the eighth tractate of the order Moed. The text contains the most important rules concerning the calendar year, together with a description of the inauguration of the months, laws on the form and use of the shofar and laws related to the religious services during the Jewish holiday of Rosh Hashanah.

== Mishna ==
The Mishnah commences with an account of the four beginnings of the religious and the civil year (1:1); it speaks of the four judgement-days of the pilgrim festivals and Rosh ha-Shanah (1:2); of the six months in which the messengers of the Sanhedrin announce the month (1:3); of the two months, the beginnings of which witnesses announce to the Sanhedrin even on the Sabbath (1:4), and even if the moon is visible to every one (1:5); Gamliel even sent on the Sabbath for forty pairs of witnesses from a distance (1:6); when father and son (who as relatives may otherwise not witness together) behold the new moon they must set out for the beth din (1:7), since they do not absolutely belong to those that are legally unfit for this purpose (1:8).

The weak and sick are borne on litters, and are protected against the attacks of the Sadducees; they must be provided with food, for witnesses were bound to journey even on the Sabbath (1:9). Others went along to identify the unknown (2:1). In olden times bonfire-signals on the mountains announced to all as far as Babylon that the month had been sanctified. The custom of having witnesses and messengers was introduced after the Sadducees had attempted to practice deception (2:2–4). The large court called Bet Ya'azeḳ was the assembly-place for the witnesses (2:5); bountiful repasts awaited them, and dispensations from the Law were granted to them (2:6); the first pair of witnesses was questioned separately concerning the appearance of the moon, but all other witnesses were questioned at least cursorily. The Mishnah makes the point that all witnesses must be made to feel their testimony is valued to ensure witnesses continue to come to courts (2:6). Then the av bet din (head of the Court) called out to a large assembly, "Sanctified!" all the people cried out aloud after him (2:8). Rabban Gamliel II had representations of the moon which he showed to the witnesses. There once arose a dispute between him and Rabbi Yehoshua regarding the Tishri moon; the latter, in obedience to the nasi, came on foot to Jamnia on the day which he had calculated to be the Day of Atonement, and the two scholars made peace (iii.). There were various obstacles to the sanctification of the months, as when time was lacking for the ceremony, or when there were no witnesses present before the bet din. In the first case the following day became the new moon; in the second case the bet din alone performed the sanctification.

The Mishnah discusses also the laws of the shofar (3:2); the horn of the cow may not be used (3:2); the form of the trumpet for Rosh haShanah, the fast-day, and Yovel is determined (3:3–5); damage to the shofar and means of repair are indicated (3:6); in times of danger the people that pray assemble in pits and caves (3:7); one passing a synagogue who hears the shofar fulfills his obligation only if he intended to fulfill it (3:7); they are exhorted to be firm by being reminded of Moses' uplifted hands in the war with the Amalekites (3:8). Deaf-mutes, insane, and children are legally unfit for blowing the shofar. Johanan ben Zakkai established that the shofar be blown at Yavneh and the surrounding places even if the festival fell on Shabbat, while at one time this was done only in the Temple (4:1); he also fixed the lulav outside of the Temple for seven days, and forbade the eating of new grain on the second day of Passover (4:2); he extended the time for examining witnesses until the evening, and had them come to Yavneh even in the absence of the av bet din (4:3). The Mishnah then discusses of the order of Rosh Hashanah Mussaf prayers (4:4); of the succession of the Malkhuyot, Zikhronot, and Shofarot; of the Bible verses concerning the kingdom of God, Providence, and the trumpet-call of the future (4:5), and of the leader in prayer and his relation to the teki'ah (4:6); descriptions of the festival are given in reference to the shofar (4:7); then follows the order of the traditional trumpet-sounds (4:8); and remarks on the duties of the leader in prayer and of the congregation close the treatise (4:9).

== Tosefta ==
Curious as is the order of subjects followed in this treatise, in which several mishnaic sources have been combined, the Tosefta follows it, adding comments that form the basis of the Gemara in both Talmuds. The contents of the Mishnah with the corresponding sections of the Tosefta are as follows:

General calendar for the year, 1:1–4 = Tosefta 1:1–13. Regulations concerning the months' witnesses, 1:5–2:1 (connecting with 1:4) = Tosefta 1:15–2:1 (abbreviated). Historical matter regarding fire-signals and messengers and their reception on the Sabbath, 2:2–6 = Tosefta 2:2 (abbreviated). The continuation of the laws of 2:1 concerning witnesses (2:7, 8), and the questioning of witnesses, and the sanctification of the months are entirely lacking in the Tosefta. Historical data concerning Gamaliel and the dispute with Joshua, 2:8–9 = Tosefta 2:3 (a mere final teaching). Continuation of the laws of 2:7 concerning witnesses, 3:1 = Tosefta 3:1, 2. Regulations regarding the shofar and its use, 3:2–5 = Tosefta 3:3–6a. Aggadic teaching on devotion = Tosefta 3:6b. Final remarks on the shofar and on its obligations, 3:6–end = Tosefta 4:1. Ordinances of Johanan ben Zakkai concerning Rosh ha-Shanah and the Sabbath, and other matters = Tosefta 4:2. Order of worship, 4:5–end = Tosefta 4:4–end.

Mishnah 2:7 seems to have been transposed according to Tosefta 4:3, but it belongs there according to its contents.

In quoting many of Gamliel's ordinances the Mishnah emphasizes the authority of the patriarchal house by recounting the dispute between the patriarch and his deputy Joshua and showing how the latter was forced to yield. The Tosefta omits the ordinances of Gamliel and of Johanan ben Zakkai, and the dispute of the two leaders of the school-house, nor does it mention anything of the power of any tannaitic dignitary; the Tosefta is here a product of the time of the Amoraim. The dignity of the nasi is not emphasized, because acumen and scholarship prevailed in the schoolhouse, and there was no desire to let old precedences (see Eduyot) come to the fore again. Even the Mishnah contains some additions from the time of the Amoraim (see, for example, 4:2, where a gap must be filled from the Tosefta).

== See also ==
- Rosh Hashanah (the festival)
- Talmud
