= Rosh Hashanah seder =

Festive meal held on the Jewish holy day of Rosh Hashanah

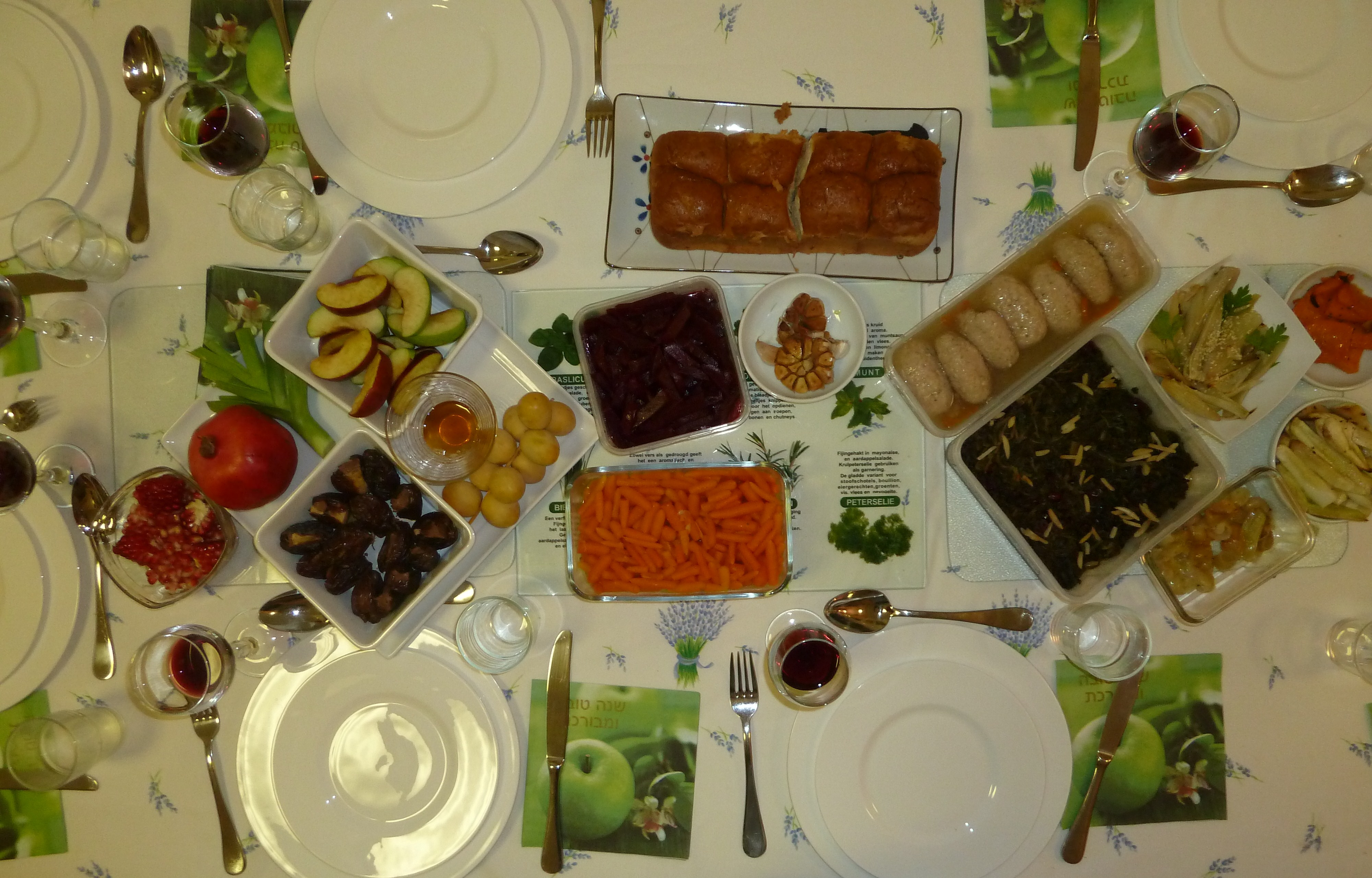
Some of the foods traditionally eaten at a Rosh Hashanah seder

The Seder for the night of Rosh Hashanah is the Jewish tradition of eating a festive meal composed of symbolic foods, reciting psalms, and singing zmirot.

The word seder means "order" in Hebrew, denoting the specific and ritually meaningful order in which the courses of the meal proceeds.

Generally, symbolic foods to be eaten during the Seder are known the Simanim (literally, "symbols" or "signs"), eaten in a specific order, with the appropriate blessings over the food.

== History ==
According to author Rahel Musleah, the tradition of holding a seder on Rosh Hashanah is at least 2000 years old. The first reference is from Nehemiah 8:9–10:

And Neḥemya ... and ῾Ezra ... and the Levi'im said to all the people, 'This day is holy to the Lord your God; do not mourn, or weep. (For all the people wept, when they heard the words of the Torah.) Then he said to them, Go your way, eat sumptuously, and drink sweet beverages, and send portions to those for whom nothing is prepared: for this day is holy to our Lord: for the joy of the Lord is your strength.

Rabbi Abaye, a rabbi of the Talmud who lived in Babylonia and one of the amoraim, said: "... an omen is a significant thing, [so] a person should always be accustomed to seeing/eating at the beginning of the year, on Rosh Hashanah, a gourd, green beans, leek, beets and dates."

It is told that in the 10th century, when the Babylonian scholar Hai Gaon left the synagogue on Rosh Hashanah, his students would bring him a basket filled with different fruits over which he recited various blessings and biblical verses:

It was found written in a letter from R[abbi] Matzliah ben Eliyahu of Sicily, who visited Rav Hai [Gaon] on Rosh Hashanah and found him returning from the synagogue and his students after him and they brought him gourds and Egyptian [fava beans] and leeks and dates and spinach and fruits in a basket and honey and peas … So did [Rav Hai Gaon] take the honey and the peas and said: “A land flowing [with milk and honey] (Exodus 3:8 and elsewhere)… And each of his students took from the basket … to his house.

The Rosh Hashanah seder has been especially practice by the Sephardi communities of the Mediterranean region and the seder and the eating of symbolic foods is sometimes assumed to have been unique to those communities, but the practice of eating symbolic foods on Rosh Hashanah was also common among Ashkenazi Jews as far back as the 1300s CE.

In the Tur, a 14th-century legal code by Rabbi Ya'akov ben Asher, a more detailed list of symbolic foods is provided, with etymological explanations of the why the foods are symbolic:

Abbaye said,"Now that you have said that a sign is a [correct] matter, a man should accustom himself to eating citron, squash, beans (rubia), leeks (karti), beets (silkei) and dates (tamrei) on Rosh Hashanah." Rashi explains that rubia is clover. Rubia - our merits should increase (yirbu); karti - (the enemies) should be cut off (yikaretu), etc.; silkei - removed (yistalku), etc.; tamrei finished (yitamu), etc.; squash because it is quick to grow. And from this grew the [various] customs, every place according to its custom; as in Germany, where they (the Jews) are accustomed to eating sweet apple with honey at the beginning of the meal, to say, "Let this new year be sweet for us." And in Provence [the Jews] are accustomed to bring all types of novelties [to the meal] and to eat a sheep's head and lung, to say, "May we be the head and not the tail" and the lung because it is light. And our teacher, Rabbi Meir of Rothenburg, was accustomed to eat the head of a ram to commemorate the ram of Yitzḥak.

== Foods ==
The following foods, referred to as simanim, are traditionally eaten, though individual customs vary:

- Beets
- Legumes or pulses
- Dates
- Leeks
- Pomegranates
- Pumpkins, squashes, or other gourds
- Beans (commonly black-eyed peas)
- The head of a fish, or beef cheek
- Apples
- Quinces
- Bee honey
- Date honey (silan)
- Carrots
- Round challot

Today, it is possible to purchase a dedicated "Rosh Hashanah Seder plate" with between 6-9 spaces to hold some of the most common simanim, according to various customs.

== Procedure ==
While practices vary between communities and families, the general procedure for a seudat Rosh Hashanah that includes a seder is as follows:

1. Lighting Rosh Hashanah candles and reciting the shehechiyanu
2. Making kiddush
3. Eating the simanim

The regular procedure for a seudah follows. After the meal, it is customary to sing zmirot.

== See also ==
- Apples and honey
- May we be the head and not the tail
