= Villino Ellul =

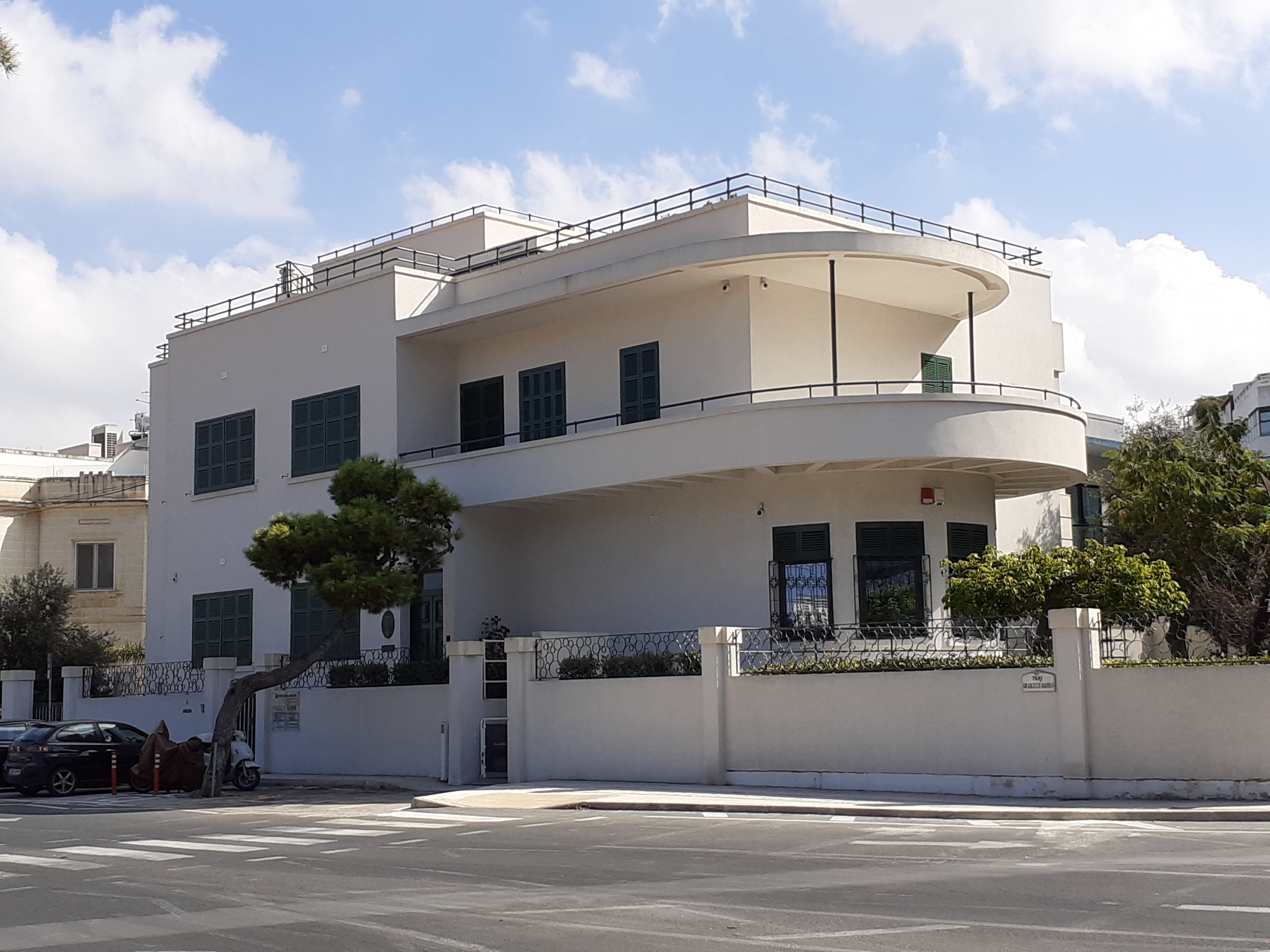
- Interactive map of the Villino Ellul area
- Alternative names: Villa Ellul; Dixcart House

General information
- Status: Intact
- Type: House (now offices)
- Architectural style: Modernist
- Location: Ta' Xbiex, Malta, 2, Sir Augustus Bartolo Street
- Coordinates: 35°54′4.4″N 14°29′41.9″E
- Current tenants: Dixcart Management Malta Ltd
- Completed: 1938
- Renovated: 2010

Technical details
- Floor count: 2

Design and construction
- Architect: Salvatore Ellul

Renovating team
- Architects: Paul Camilleri & Associates

Villino Ellul or Villa Ellul is a Modernist villa in Ta' Xbiex, Malta. It was designed and built in the 1930s by the architect Salvatore Ellul as his personal villa, and it was one of the first Modernist buildings to be built on the island. The building has been restored and converted into offices, and it is now known as Dixcart House.

== History ==
Villino Ellul was built in 1937–38 by the architect Salvatore Ellul as his personal villa. Ellul and his family moved out of the building when World War II broke out, since the location was prone to air raids given its proximity to Marsamxett Harbour. However, the building escaped aerial bombardment and survived the war intact.

The building was restored by Paul Camilleri & Associates in 2010, and it was converted into offices. It now houses Dixcart Management Malta Limited, and it is therefore known as Dixcart House.

Villino Ellul was scheduled as a Grade 2 building in 2012.

== Architecture ==
Villino Ellul is one of the earliest Modernist buildings in Malta, and it was an avant-garde building by local standards, not least since it is located in a neighbourhood containing many classical or Art Deco houses. The building shows inspiration from the work of Le Corbusier, Charles Holden and the Italian Rationalists.

The building uses sharp lines and delicate curves, and it has a white finish devoid of any applied ornamentation. The villa includes a cantilevered reinforced concrete semi-circular terrace around part of the façade.

Ellul also designed the building's interior as well as details such as the doors, railings and other finishes. The building's interior shows some Art Deco influences.

Mark G. Muscat stated that the Villino Ellul is "one of the earliest examples of the International Style in Malta", in which "the close collaboration between Charles Holden (1875-1960) and Ellul is evident".
