= Apples and honey =

Ashkenazi Jewish holiday food

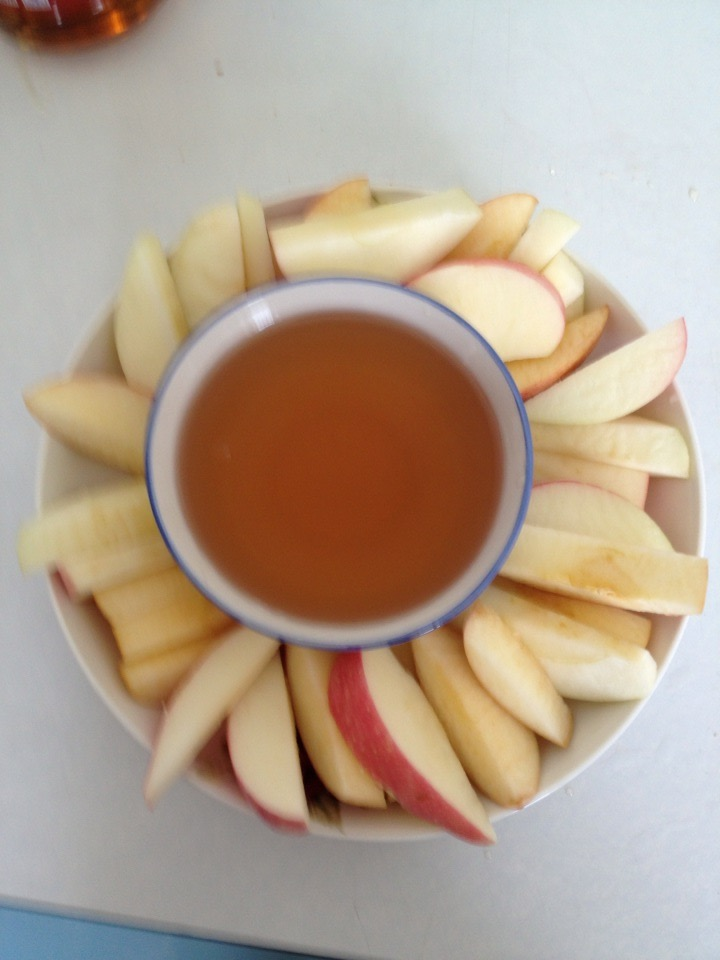
- Place of origin: Originally Europe, also Jewish diaspora
- Serving temperature: Room temperature
- Main ingredients: Apples, honey

Apples and honey is a traditional dish served by Ashkenazi Jews on Rosh Hashanah, the Jewish New Year's Day and the beginning of the High Holidays.

== History ==
Ancient Israelites likely did not eat apples and honey, since apples were not cultivated in the Levant at the time. Honey from wild bees is attested in the Bible and archaeologists have discovered an apiary from the 10th century BCE in Israel. However, boiled fruit syrups, such as date honey, were the more common form of honey at the time.

The first known connection between apples and Rosh Hashanah is in the prayer book Machzor Vitry, written in 11th-century CE France. The first known mention of apples and honey being eaten on Rosh Hashanah comes from the 14th-century legal work Arba'ah Turim, which states that German Jews ate apples and honey in order to bring sweetness into the New Year. A contemporary of the author of Arba'ah Turim, Alexander Suslin, in his book Sefer Ha'agudah, attributes the custom to the Geonim.

== Overview ==
Apples and honey consists of raw apples sliced and served with a separate dish of honey. A blessing is said in Hebrew over the apples and honey, to ask for a "Sweet New Year", and the apple is then dipped into the honey and eaten. Dipping apples in honey is a minhag and is not dictated by the Tanakh or the Talmud.

== In American-Jewish culture ==
Ahead of Rosh Hashanah in English-speaking Ashkenazic schools, young schoolchildren learn the "dip the apple in the honey" song (to the tune of Oh My Darling, Clementine).

== See also ==
- Rosh Hashanah seder
- Jewish cuisine
- Caramel apple
