= Salvatore Ellul =

Maltese architect (1891–1961)

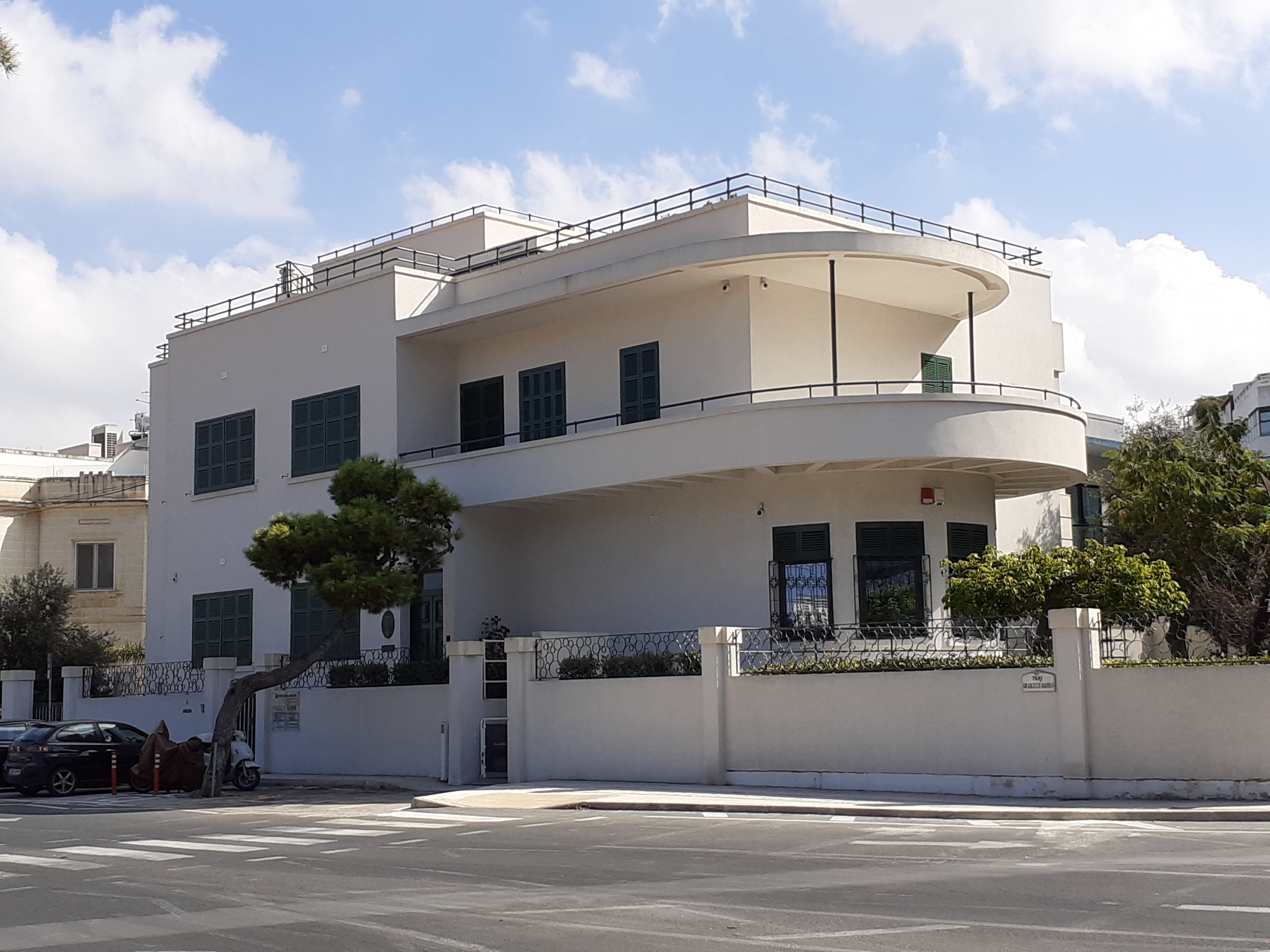
Villino Ellul in Ta' Xbiex (1938)

Salvatore Ellul (1891–1961) was a Maltese architect.

Ellul served at Malta's Public Works department for most of his life and was responsible for the post-war rebuilding of L-Isla, Bormla and Birgu. Based on designs by London's firm Adams, Holden and Pearson, Ellul was appointed project architect for the St Luke Hospital, endeavour which kept him busy for a whole decade. His collaboration with Charles Holden (1875-1960) is also evident in later project, including his own Villino Ellul house in Ta' Xbiex. In his obituary, he was remembered also as a teacher: "many of our stone masons owe to him their Master's degree learnt during evening classes where he taught".
