= Shofar blowing =

Prescribed method of blowing the ram's horn on the Jewish New Year

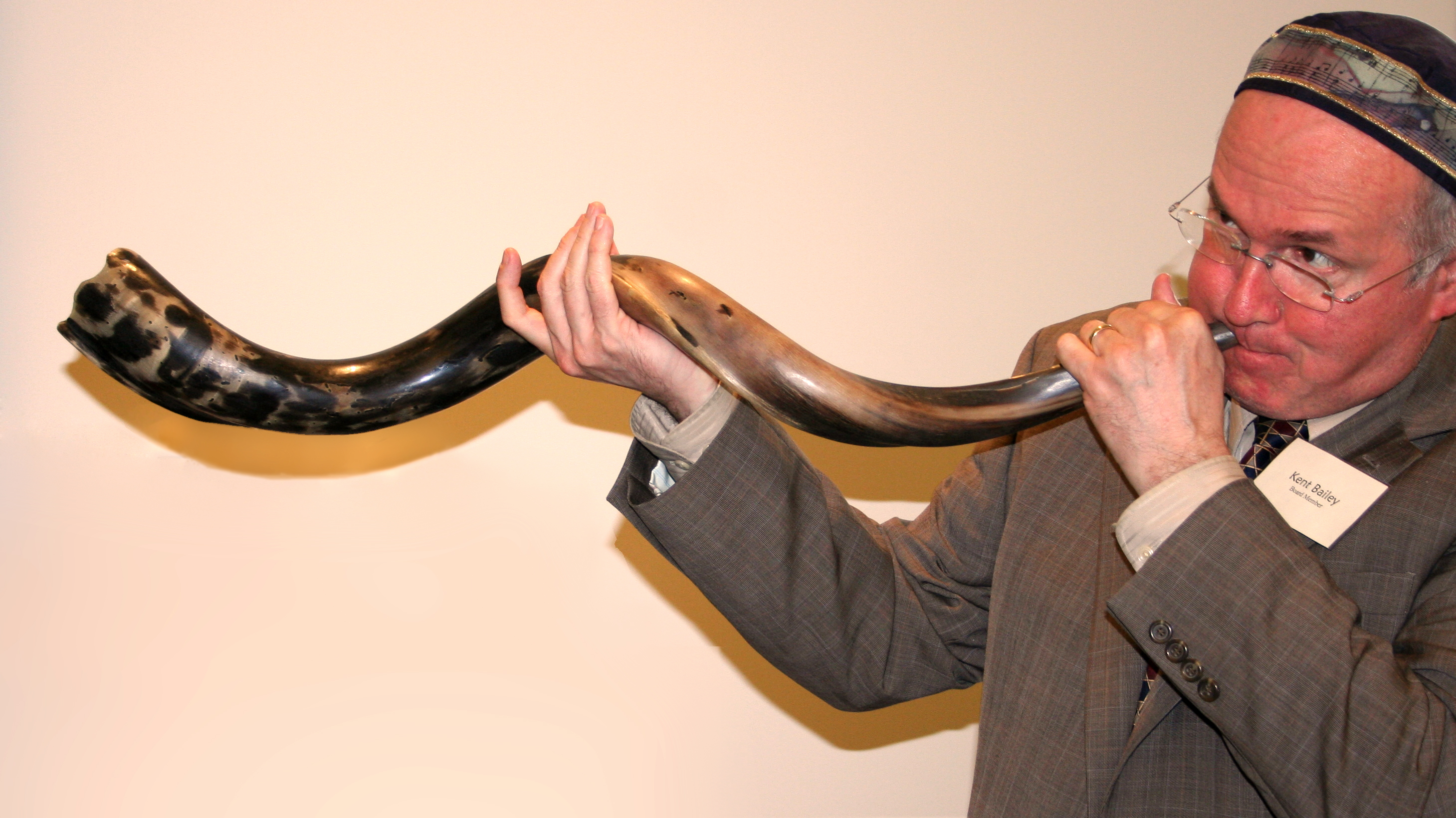
A man blowing a shofar

The blowing of the shofar (Hebrew: תקיעת שופר, Hebrew pronunciation: [t(e)kiˈ(ʔ)at ʃoˈfaʁ]) is an ancient tradition performed by Israelites on Rosh Hashanah . It is also used on Yom Kippur. It is only removed from holiday services if Yom Kippur or Rosh Hashanah fall on the Holy day of Rosh Hashanah. The shofar is a musical horn, typically made of a ram's horn. The Jewish law added requirements that the shofar be blown 30 times on each day of Rosh Hashanah, and by custom it is blown 100, 101 or 102 times on each day.

Speak unto the children of Israel, saying: In the seventh month, in the first day of the month, shall be a solemn rest unto you, a memorial proclaimed with the blast of horns, a holy convocation.

== Modern practice ==
Initially, the blasts made by the ram's horn were blown during the first standing prayer (Amidah) on the Jewish New Year, but by a rabbinic edict, it was enacted that they be blown only during the Mussaf-prayer, because of an incident that happened, whereby congregants who blew the horn during the first standing prayer were suspected by their enemies of staging a war-call and were massacred. Even though the underlining motive for the rabbinic enactment was no longer prevalent in ensuing generations, their enactment still stands and is practised by all Jewish communities to this very day, to blow the ram's horn only during the Mussaf-prayer.

=== Types of blast ===
The following blast are blown on Rosh Hashanah:

- Tekiah (תקיעה) is a single long blast of the shofar.
- Shevarim (שברים) is composed of three connected short sounds.
- Teruah (תרועה) - in most Sephardic and Ashkenazi traditions, this is a string of many short-lived, broken blasts made by the tongue (e.g. tut-tut-tut-tut, etc.). In the Yemenite, Tunisian and Babylonian Jewish communities as well as many Western Ashkenazi communities, it is a single long, reverberating blast.
- It is customary for the last tekiah in a set of 30, and the last tekiah blown overall on a day of Rosh Hashana, to be extended in length, called a tekiah gedolah ("great tekiah").

=== Combinations of blasts ===
The blasts are blown in the following set groups:

- tekiah-shevarim-teruah-tekiah (abbreviated TaShRaT) [being a long sustained blast (tekiah), followed by three short lilting blasts (shevarim), with the resounding pitch of a person who is crying, followed by a long quavering blast (teruah), followed by another long sustained blast (tekiah).
- tekiah-shevarim-tekiah (abbreviated TaShaT) [being one long sustained blast (tekiah), followed by three short lilting blasts (shevarim), followed by a long sustained blast (tekiah).
- tekiah-teruah-tekiah (abbreviated TaRaT) [being a long sustained blast (tekiah), followed by a long quavering blast (teruah), and again a long sustained blast (tekiah).

=== Place in the prayer service ===
Shofar sound for Rosh Hashana, Ashkenaz version, preceded by two blessings

In Ashkenazi and Sephardic communities, it is customary to hear 100 or 101 or 102 sounds in the synagogue on Rosh Hashanah morning, although the minimum requirement is to hear 30 sounds. The sounds are scheduled as follows:

- 30 shofar blasts are sounded to fulfill the mitzvah of shofar blowing, after the Torah reading and before Mussaf. In many communities, these blasts are preceded by reciting Bible verses related to the shofar. Two blessings are recited before the blasts: one on the Biblical commandment of "hearing the sound of the shofar", and the blessing of Shehecheyanu; on the second day (except when the first day falls on the Sabbath), Sephardic Jews and Western Ashknazic Jews omit Shehecheyanu, but Eastern Ashkenazic Jews recite it. The blasts here consist of the TaShRaT sequence three times, followed by TaShaT three times, then TaRaT three times.
- In most Sephardic and many Hasidic communities, 30 shofar blasts are blown in the silent Mussaf prayer, 10 blasts after each of the three central blessings. Each sequence of 10 blasts consists of TaShRaT, TaShaT, TaRaT one time each. In most Ashkenazic communities, these blasts are not performed.
- Shofar is blown during the leader's repetition of the Mussaf prayer. There are several customs for how this is done:
  - The original custom from the Geonim is to blow one TaShRaT after the first blessing, one TaShaT after the second blessing, and one TaRaT after the third blessing, for a total of 10 blasts during the repetition of Musaf. This custom has been preserved in the Western Ashkenazic rite and many Yemenite Jews.
    - A variation of that opinion is to blow three TaShRaT after the first blessing, three TaShaT after the second blessing, and three TaRaT after the third blessing, for a total of 30 blasts during the repetition of Musaf. This is the custom today of Spanish and Portuguese Jews.
  - Another version, suggested by Rabbeinu Tam, is to blow one TaShRaT after each blessing, for a total of 12 blasts during the repetition of Musaf. Until recently, this was the widespread custom in Eastern Ashkenazic communities, but it is preserved today in very few places.
  - Most Eastern Ashkenazic (except for those that preserve the previous practice above) and Edot Hamizrach communizes today follow the opinion of the Shelah to blow 10 blasts - TaShRaT, TaShaT, TaRaT - after each of the three blessings.
- In most communities, as many blasts are needed to get to a total of 100, 101 or 102 are blown after musaf. Thus, in communities where they blow 30 during the silent Amidah and 30 during the repetition, only 10 or 11 are needed to complete the 100 or 101. In communities where shofar is not blown during the silent Mussaf prayer and they blow 30 during the repetition, 40 or 41 blasts are blown. And in communities following the opinion of the Geonim or Rabbeinu Tam, 60 blasts are blown after musaf; in communities following the Geonim, this makes a total of 100, whereas in communities following the opinion of Rabbeninu Tam, they end up with 102.

According to all opinions, the mitzvah is fulfilled by hearing the initial set of 30 blasts. Thus, if a person cannot attend the synagogue prayers, they will commonly arrange for a shofar blower to visit and blow only 30 blasts for them.

== Additional laws ==
=== Duration of the notes ===
Among Ashkenazi and Sephardic communities, the teruah is blown as nine very short notes, while the shevarim is blown as three longer notes, each equal in duration to three short notes. The tekiah must be longer than the blast which it comes before and after. Thus the tekiah must be more than 9 short notes in duration when blowing TaRaT or TaShaT, and more than 18 short notes when blowing TaShRaT.

The Shulchan Aruch rules that the minimum length of a teruah and tekiah are identical, but agrees that a longer teruah is also valid. In Yemen, the practice was to make the teruah double the length of a tekiah. Each community is advised to follow its ancestral tradition.

=== Pausing between shevarim and teruah ===
When shevarim and teruah are blown together, a dispute exists whether they must be blown in a single breath, or whether one may pause (for a duration of no longer than a breath) between them. The Shulchan Aruch suggests that "one who fears God" should blow in a single breath before Mussaf, and with two breaths during Mussaf. The Chazon Ish adopted this practice. However, general Ashkenazi custom is to always stop for breath between shevarim and teruah, both before and during Mussaf (but not between the three blasts of shevarim), although some communities which follow the mainstream Ashkenazic custom still do the blasts after musaf in one breath.

Rabbi Yihya Saleh, explaining the Yemenite custom, wrote that a breath is taken between shevarim and teruah, both before and during Mussaf. In this regard, the Yemenite practice was more lenient than that of the Shulchan Aruch.

== History ==
=== Initial 9 blasts ===
The Torah twice defines Rosh Hashanah as a day of teruah or horn-blowing (Leviticus 23:24, Numbers 29:1), without specifying exactly how this is to be done.

The rabbis of the Talmud concluded that a shofar must be used for this blowing, and that each teruah must be preceded and followed by a tekiah. Since the word teruah appears three times in the Torah in connection with holidays of the seventh month, the rabbis concluded that a teruah must be blown three times, making a total of nine blasts (three sets of tekiah-teruah-tekiah). The three sets also correspond to the three special blessings of Mussaf: malchiyot, zichronot, and shofarot.

=== From 9 to 30 blasts ===
In the Talmudic era, doubts arose regarding the correct sound of the teruah blast - whether it should be a series of short, lilting blasts similar to a person moaning (now known as shevarim), or else a staccato beat sound similar to a person whimpering (now known as teruah), or else a combination of the two sounds (shevarim-teruah). Therefore, Abbahu of Caesarea Maritima (died c. 320), ruled that shofar blowing should be performed according to each of the three possibilities:

- Three sets of tekiah, teruah, tekiah (in case what we call teruah is the correct sound of the Biblical teruah)
- Three sets of tekiah, shevarim, tekiah (in case what we call shevarim is the correct sound of the Biblical teruah)
- Three sets of tekiah, shevarim-teruah, tekiah (in case what we call shevarim-teruah is the correct sound of the Biblical teruah)

If tekiah, shevarim teruah, tekiah is considered to be four blasts, then Abbahu's requirement makes for a total of 30 blasts.

According to another opinion, Abbahu instituted a total of twelve rather than 30 blasts, specifically tekiah, shevarim teruah, tekiah repeated three times according to Isaac Alfasi (died 1103), Halakhot, Rosh Hashanah 10b. However, modern halakha accepts the opinion that 30 blasts are blown following the Shulchan Aruch, Orach Chaim 590:2.

=== From 30 to 100 blasts ===
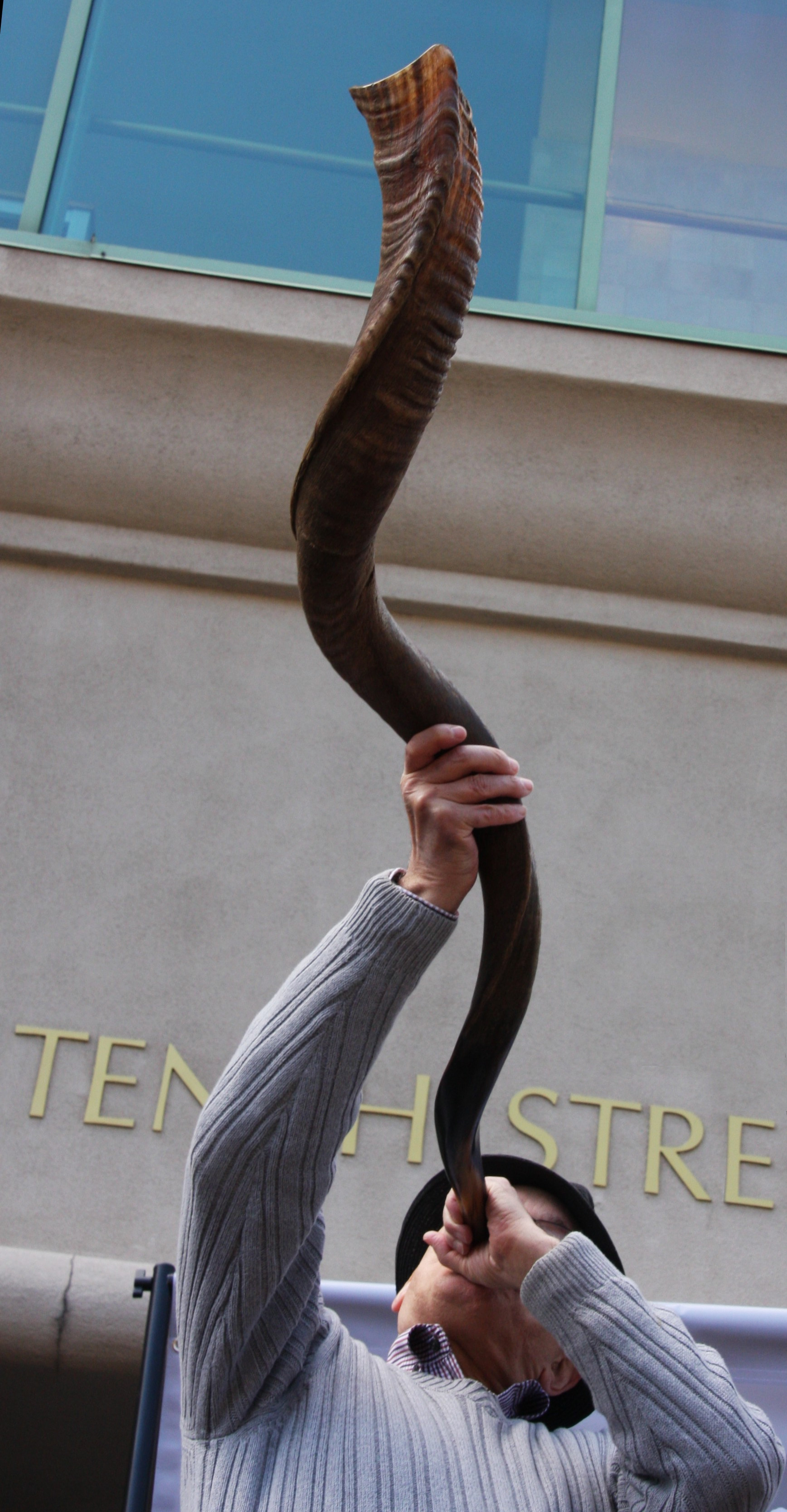
A man blowing a shofar

The Talmud specifies that the shofar is blown on two occasions on Rosh Hashana: once while "sitting" (before the Mussaf prayer), and once while "standing" (during the Mussaf prayer). This increases the number of blasts from the basic requirement of 30, to 40, 42, or 60, based on the above-mentioned opinions.

The Arukh mentions a custom to blow 100 blasts: 30 before Mussaf, 30 during the Mussaf silent prayer, 30 during the cantor's loud repetition of Mussaf, and 10 more after Mussaf. The final 10 blasts are by tradition dating to the Geonim, and in some communities are blown in the middle of "Kaddish Tiskabal." Blowing 100 (or 101 or 102) blasts is nearly universal today (with the exception of many Yemenite and Spanish Portuguese Jews), although many congregations omit the 30 blasts in the silent prayer, and instead blow 40 after Mussaf, and some communities do only 10 (or 12) during the repetition and blow 60 afterwards.

The number 100 in the Arukh is intended to correspond to the tears which Sisera's mother is said to have shed when her son was killed in battle. (The Hebrew word used to describe her wailing is wateyabev (ותיבב); this is cognate to yevava (יבבה), the Aramaic translation of teruah.) The short Biblical story of Sisera's mother contains 101 letters; while the Arukh only mentions 100 blasts. This discrepancy is explained by saying that while each shofar blast is intended to "nullify" one of her cries due to hatred of Israel, nevertheless we leave her one tear out of recognition of the pain suffered by any bereaved mother. In any case, Sephardic communities typically blow 101 blasts, with the 101st symbolizing her legitimate mourning.

== Symbolic meaning ==
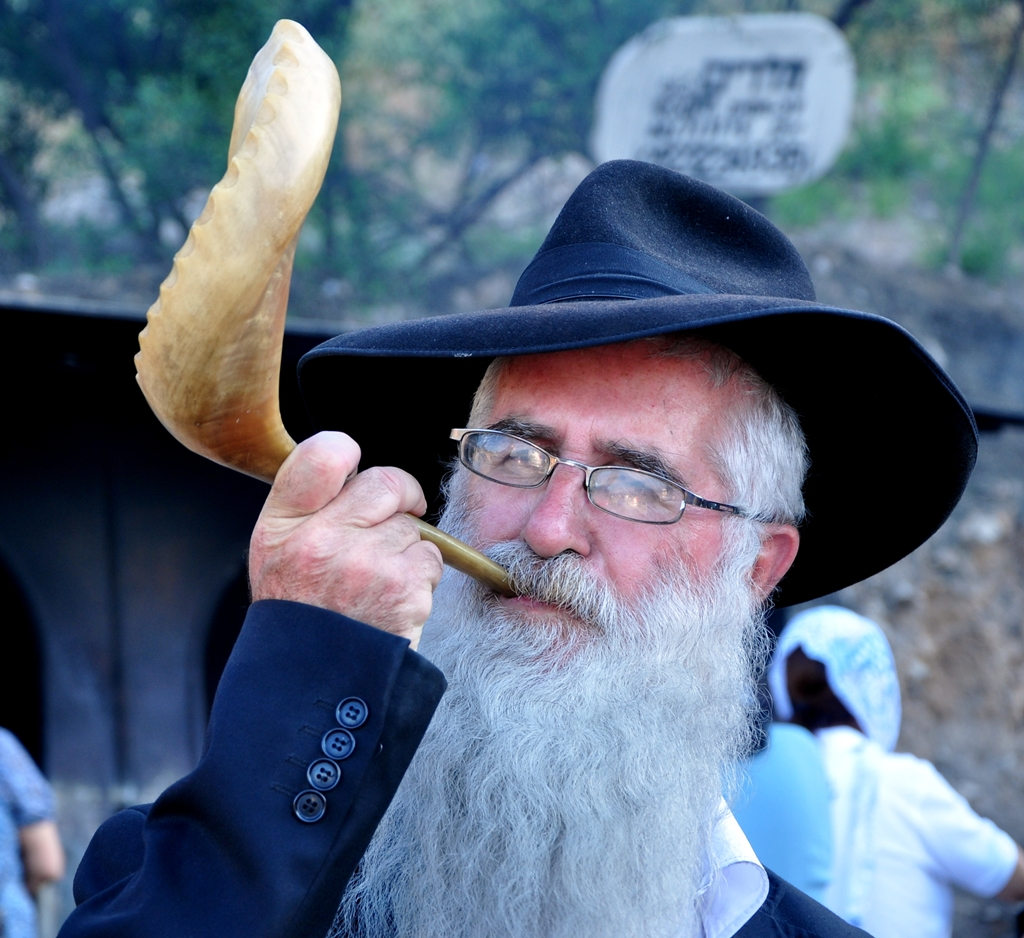
A Haredi man blowing a shofar

Maimonides wrote that even though the blowing of the shofar is a Biblical statute to praise the God, it is also a symbolic "wake-up call", stirring Jews to mend their ways and repent: "Sleepers, wake up from your slumber! Examine your ways and repent and remember your Creator."

Rabbi Abraham Isaac Kook suggested that the doubt whether the shofar sound is supposed to be short, intermittent blasts (Shevarim), like a person groaning in remorse, or a series of short, staccato bursts (Teru'ah), like the uncontrolled wailing of a person in extreme anguish and grief, may be connected to Maimonides’ explanation. Some people are moved to better themselves due to an intellectual recognition that something was seriously amiss in their lives. Their shofar sounds – what motivates them to repent – are the heavy sighs and groans of the introspective individual, the Shevarim. For others, the stimulus comes from the heart. They are moved by the overwhelming pain and anguish of a person who has lost his way – the emotional outburst and wailing of the Teru’ah. The most effective form of repentance, however, utilizes the strengths of both faculties, the emotions and the intellect, combining together the Shevarim and the Teru'ah.

== Health Issues ==
Some people may be vulnerable to physical demands of sustaining pressurized blowing through an embouchure may be associated with health risks associated with physical demands of pressing the shofar against lips, and the pressurized exhalation needed to produce and sustain blowing pressure.
