= Anthony Ellul =

Maltese judge

Anthony Ellul (born August 1966) is a Maltese judge.

A graduate of the University of Malta, after serving as lawyer at the office of Malta's Attorney General, Ellul was appointed a magistrate in 2007 (serving at the Gozo Courts) and elevated to judge in 2011, both times under Prime Minister Lawrence Gonzi. He sits also in the Constitutional Court of Malta.

As one of the most senior judges, in late 2025 Ellul was deemed to "command considerable respect within the judiciary" and was considered as a candidate to succeed Mark Chetcuti as Chief Justice of Malta.

== See also ==
- Judiciary of Malta
