= Elul =

6th month of the Hebrew calendar

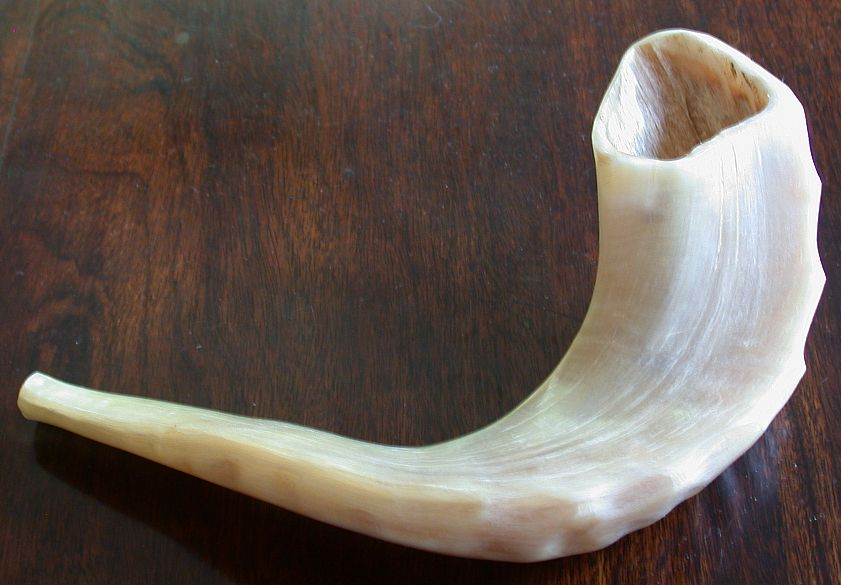
- The shofar is blown every morning from the first day of Elul until Rosh Hashanah (except on Shabbat).
- Native name: אֱלוּל (Hebrew)
- Calendar: Hebrew calendar
- Month number: 6
- Number of days: 29
- Season: Summer (Northern Hemisphere)
- Gregorian equivalent: August–September

Elul (Hebrew: אֱלוּל, Standard ʾElūl, Tiberian ʾĔlūl, Arabic: أيلول) is the twelfth month of the civil year and the sixth month of the religious year in the Hebrew calendar. It is a month of 29 days. Elul usually occurs in August–September on the Gregorian calendar.

== Etymology ==
The name of the month Elul, like the names of the rest of the Hebrew calendar months, was brought from the Babylonian captivity, and originated from the Akkadian word for "harvest". A similar month name was also used in Akkadian, in the form Elūlu. The month is known as Araḫ Ulūlu "harvest month" in the Babylonian calendar. The only difference is that in the Babylonian calendar, Ulūlu can serve as a leap month, while in the Jewish calendar, only Adar can serve as a leap month.

Eylül is also the name for September in Turkish; this is derived from Arabic: أيلول ʾAylūl, used in Iraq and the Levant (see Arabic names of Gregorian months), from Classical Syriac: ܐܝܼܠܘܼܠ, romanized: Īlūl, also tracing its origin from the Akkadian word Elūlu. In Hebrew, a popular backronym for Elul is from a verse in the Song of Songs: Ani LeDodi VeDodi Li (Chapter 6, verse 3A).

== Customs ==
In Jewish tradition, the month of Elul is a time of repentance in preparation for the High Holy Days of Rosh Hashanah and Yom Kippur. The word "Elul" is similar to the root of the verb "search" in Aramaic. Jewish sources from the 14th century and on write that the Hebrew word "Elul" can be understood to be an bacronym for the phrase "Ani L'dodi V'dodi Li" – "I am my beloved's and my beloved is mine", referring to one's relationship with God. Elul is seen as a time to search one's heart and draw close to God in preparation for the coming Day of Judgement, Rosh Hashanah, and Day of Atonement, Yom Kippur. Rabbi Shneur Zalman of Liadi compared, by way of analogy, the month of Elul to a king visiting his peasants in the field before returning to his palace.

During the month of Elul, there are a number of special rituals leading up to the High Holy Days. It is customary to blow the shofar every morning (except on Shabbat) from Rosh Hodesh Elul (the first day of the month) until the day before Rosh Hashanah. The blasts are meant to awaken one's spirits and inspire believers to begin the soul searching which will prepare them for the High Holy Days. As part of this preparation, Elul is the time to begin the sometimes-difficult process of granting and asking for forgiveness. It is also customary to recite a Psalm (27) every day from Rosh Hodesh Elul through Hoshanah Rabbah on Sukkot (in Tishrei).

Aside from the blowing of the shofar, the other significant ritual practice during Elul is to recite selichot (special penitential prayers) either every morning before sunrise beginning on the Sunday immediately before Rosh Hashanah, or, if starting Sunday would not afford four days of selichot, then the Sunday one week prior (Ashkenazi tradition) or every morning during the entire month of Elul (Sephardi tradition). Ashkenazi Jews begin the recitation of selichot with a special service on Saturday night between solar midnight (not 12:00) and morning light on the first day of Selichot.

Many Jews also visit the graves of loved ones throughout the month in order to remember and honor them.

Another social custom is to begin or end all letters written during the month of Elul with wishes that the recipient have a good year. The standard blessing is "K'tiva VaHatima Tova" ("a good writing and sealing [of judgement]"), meaning that the person should be written and sealed in the Book of Life for a good year. Tradition teaches that on Rosh Hashanah, each person is written down for a good or a poor year, based on their actions in the previous one, and their sincere efforts at atoning for mistakes or harm. On Yom Kippur, that fate is "sealed."

== In Jewish history ==
- 1 Elul (1313 BCE) – Moses ascends Mount Sinai for 3rd set of 40 days
- 1 Elul (520 BCE) – The Prophet Haggai commands that the rebuilding of the Second Temple continue
- 2 Elul (1555) – Shulchan Aruch published
- 3 Elul (1935) – Death of Abraham Isaac Kook
- 5 Elul – Ezekiel the prophet has a prophecy of the destruction of Solomon's Temple
- 6 Elul (1972) – The Munich Olympics massacre occurs, in which 11 Israeli athletes are murdered by Palestinian terrorists.
- 9 Elul (1943) – The Vilna Ghetto is sealed, cutting Jews off from the outside world and marking the transition from persecution to systematic destruction in Lithuania.
- 10 Elul (2105 BCE) – Noah dispatches raven
- 12 Elul (1294) – Birth of Nachmanides
- 12 Elul (1945) – Rabbi Shlomo Zev Zweigenhaft publicly performs the first shechitah on German soil since it was outlawed by the Nazis in 1933.
- 13 Elul (1909) – Death of Yosef Hayyim
- 14 Elul (1983) – Birth of Shlomo Rafuel Ben Moshe Dovid
- 14 Elul (2024) – “Operation Grim Beeper”
- 15 Elul (1964) – birth of Watson de Emmanuel, OBE
- 17 Elul (2105 BCE) – Noah dispatches dove
- 18 Elul (1609) – Death of Judah Loew ben Bezalel
- 18 Elul (1698) – Birth of Baal Shem Tov
- 18 Elul (1745) – Birth of rabbi Shneur Zalman of Liadi
- 23 Elul (2105 BCE) – Dove brings olive Leaf to Noah
- 23 Elul (1942) – Death of the Grand Rabbi of Aleksander, Yitzchak Menachem Danziger, in Treblinka
- 23 Elul (1978) – Vladimir Horowitz Golden Jubilee Concert was broadcast live by NBC from Avery Fisher Hall of New York Philharmonic conducted by Zubin Mehta
- 23 Elul (2001) – September 11 attacks
- 24 Elul (1933) – Death of Israel Meir Kagan
- 25 Elul (3761 BCE) – The 1st day of the world according to the Genesis creation narrative
- 25 Elul (335 BCE) – Jerusalem Walls Rebuilt
- 25 Elul (2nd century CE) – Death of Eleazar ben Simeon, son of Simeon bar Yochai
- 25 Elul (2016) – Death of Shimon Peres
- 27 Elul (1855 CE) – Death of Sholom Rokeach
- 28 Elul (1983 CE) – Death of Rabbi Yoel Halpern
- 29 Elul (1789 CE) – Birth of Menachem Mendel Schneersohn

== See also ==
- Jewish astrology
- Repentance in Judaism
- Rosh Hashanah LeMa'sar Behemah
- Song of Songs
- Ellul
