= Rosh Hashanah =

Jewish New Year

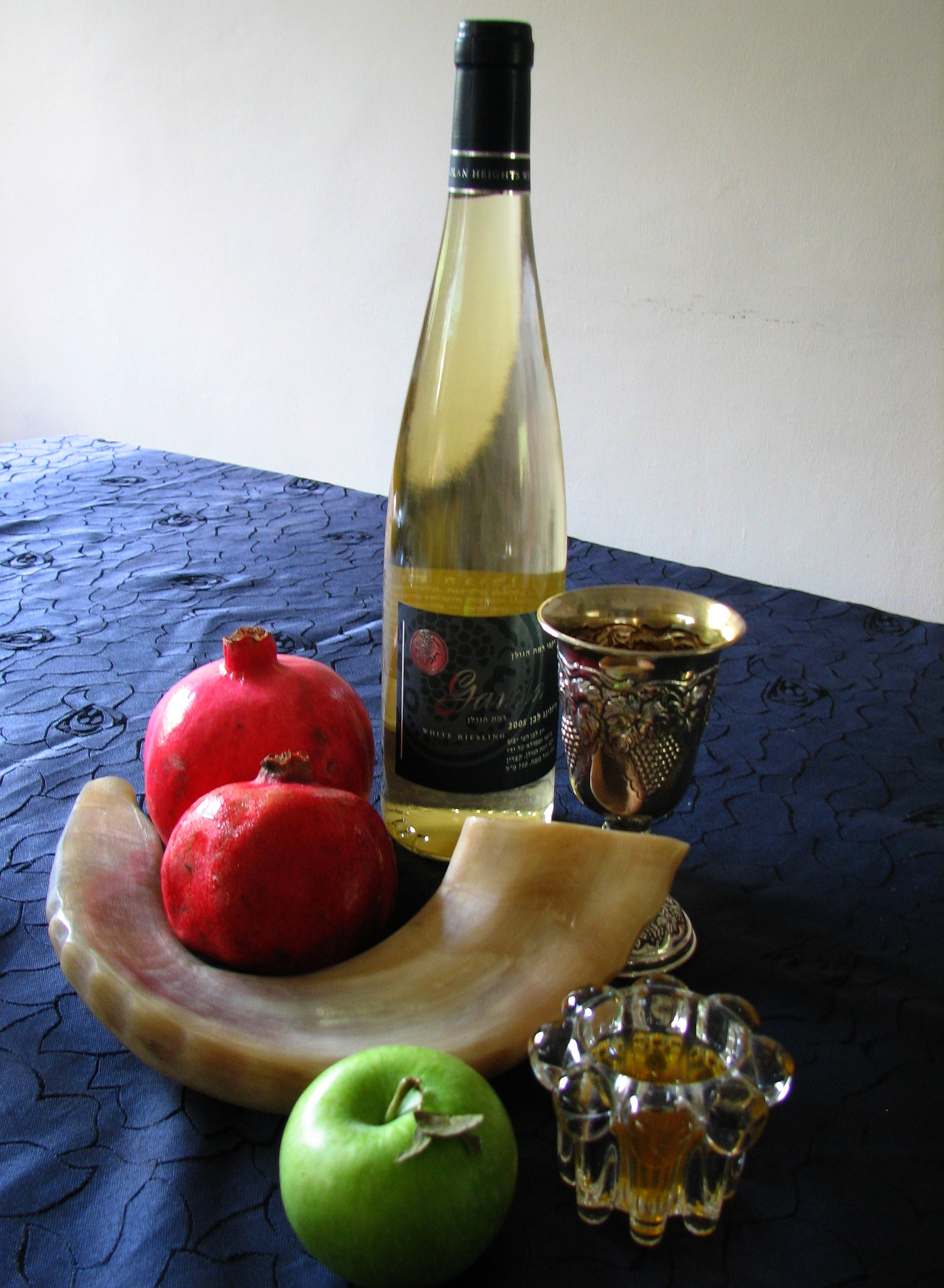
- A shofar, pomegranates, wine for kiddush, apple and honey – symbols of the Rosh Hashanah holiday
- Official name: רֹאשׁ הַשָּׁנָה
- Also called: Jewish New Year
- Type: Jewish
- Observances: Praying in synagogue, personal reflection, and hearing or blowing the shofar.
- Begins: Start of first day of Tishrei
- Ends: End of second day of Tishrei
- Date: 1 Tishrei, 2 Tishrei
- 2025 date: Sunset, 22 September – nightfall, 24 September
- 2026 date: Sunset, 11 September – nightfall, 13 September
- 2027 date: Sunset, 1 October – nightfall, 3 October
- 2028 date: Sunset, 20 September – nightfall, 22 September

Rosh Hashanah (pronounced [ˌʁoʃ haʃaˈna]; Hebrew: רֹאשׁ הַשָּׁנָה, romanized: rôš haššānāh, lit. 'head of the year') is the New Year in Judaism. The biblical name for the holiday is Yom Teruah (IPA: [joːm təruːˈʕaː]; Biblical Hebrew: יוֹם תְּרוּעָה, romanized: yôm terûʿāh, lit. 'day of blasting'). It is the first of the High Holy Days (יָמִים נוֹרָאִים, yāmīm nōrāʾīm, 'days of awe'), as specified by Leviticus 23:23–32, which occur in the late summer and early autumn in the Northern Hemisphere. Rosh Hashanah commences the Ten Days of Repentance (עֲשֶׂרֶת יְמֵי תְּשׁוּבָה, ʿăśeret yəmê təšûvāh), culminating in Yom Kippur, the day of atonement. It is followed by the festival of Sukkot, which is immediately followed by Shemini Atzeret and Simchat Torah, ending the High Holy Day season.

Rosh Hashanah is a two-day observance and celebration that begins on the first day of Tishrei, which is the seventh month of the Hebrew year. Like all Jewish holidays, it follows a lunisolar calendar and begins the evening prior to the first day. Rosh Hashanah is one of four Jewish New Years and marks the beginning of the civil year. It is the traditional anniversary of the creation of Adam and Eve, the first man and woman according to the Hebrew Bible, as well as the initiation of humanity's role in God's world. The Amoraim, the Jewish sages whose debates are recorded in the Gemara in the Talmud, characterized the day of Rosh Hashanah as the day of God's coronation as king over all living beings. This is effectuated through the shofar blasts delivered throughout the High Holiday season—and in the month preceding it—that symbolize the horns sounded at God's coronation, as well as a call for repentance. Other customs include the consumption of symbolic foods meant to represent the sweetness of a new year. Synagogue service attendance, the recitation of special liturgies, enjoyment of festive meals, and rest are defining components of Rosh Hashanah observance. Additionally, Tashlich (lit. 'to cast'), is a ritual performed between the first day of Rosh Hashanah and Hoshana Rabbah. Participants recite specific prayers by water, seeking divine forgiveness by symbolically shaking out their garments and casting away their sins into the depths of the waters. In many communities, this is done by throwing stones or pieces of bread into the water.

== Etymology ==
Rosh is the Hebrew word for "head", ha is the definite article ("the"), and shanah means year. Thus Rosh Hashanah means "head of the year", referring to the day of the New Year.

The term Rosh Hashanah in its current meaning does not appear in the Torah. Leviticus 23:24 refers to the festival of the first day of the seventh month as zikhron teru'ah ("a memorial of blowing [of horns]"). Numbers 29:1 calls the festival yom teru'ah ("day of blowing [the horn]").

The term rosh hashanah appears once in the Bible (Ezekiel 40:1), where it has a different meaning: either generally the time of the "beginning of the year", or possibly a reference to Yom Kippur, or to the month of Nisan. (Note: Exodus 12:2 refers to the month of Aviv (later renamed Nisan) as "the first month of the year", and in Ezekiel 45:18, "the first month" unambiguously refers to Nisan, the month of Passover, as made plain by Ezekiel 45:21.)

In the prayer books (siddurs and machzors), Rosh Hashanah is also called Yom haZikkaron "the day of remembrance", not to be confused with the modern Israeli remembrance day of the same name.

== Origin ==
The holiday first appears in the Book of Leviticus, in a chapter devoted to outlining all the holidays of the year:

In the seventh month, on the first day of the month, you shall have a sabbath-rest, a memorial of blowing of trumpets, a holy convocation. You shall do no customary work on it; and you shall offer an offering made by fire to the Lord.

Similar verses appear again in the Book of Numbers. These verses do not describe the holiday as a New Year celebration, but simply as a feast of trumpets that precedes the day of atonement, Yom Kippur, which is described immediately after.

The holiday's role as one of the Jewish New Years first appears in rabbinic literature, and is thoroughly discussed in the Mishna and Talmud in Rosh Hashanna tractate. Rosh Hashanah is the new year for calculating ordinary calendar years, Sabbatical years, Jubilee years, and dates inscribed on legal deeds and contracts. It also commemorates the creation of humankind, which allowed God to form a relationship with his creation and take his position as king over them.

The origin of the New Year is connected to the beginning of the economic year in the agricultural societies of the ancient Near East. The New Year was the beginning of the cycle of sowing, growth, and harvest; the harvest was marked by its own set of major agricultural festivals. Semitic speakers generally set the beginning of the new year in autumn, while other ancient civilizations chose spring for that purpose, such as the Persians or Greeks or Hindus; the primary reason was agricultural in both cases, the time of sowing the seed and bringing in the harvest.

Some scholars posit a connection between the Babylonian festival Akitu and Rosh Hashanah, as there are some striking similarities. The Akitu festival of Ur was celebrated at the beginning of Nisanu (first month), which lasted at least five days, and again in Tashritu, the seventh month, which lasted eleven days. Akitu was also strongly tied to the creation myth of Enuma Elish and the victory of Marduk over the sea monster Tiamat, and the creation of the universe from her corpse. Similarly, it is said that the world was created on Rosh Hashanah.

Another view is that the birth of mankind, and by extension the anniversary of the world's creation, along with its significance as a day of coronation of God, was a tradition passed down from Adam and Eve who were created on that day. They passed it down through the generations until it was finally recorded in the Talmud.

== Religious significance ==
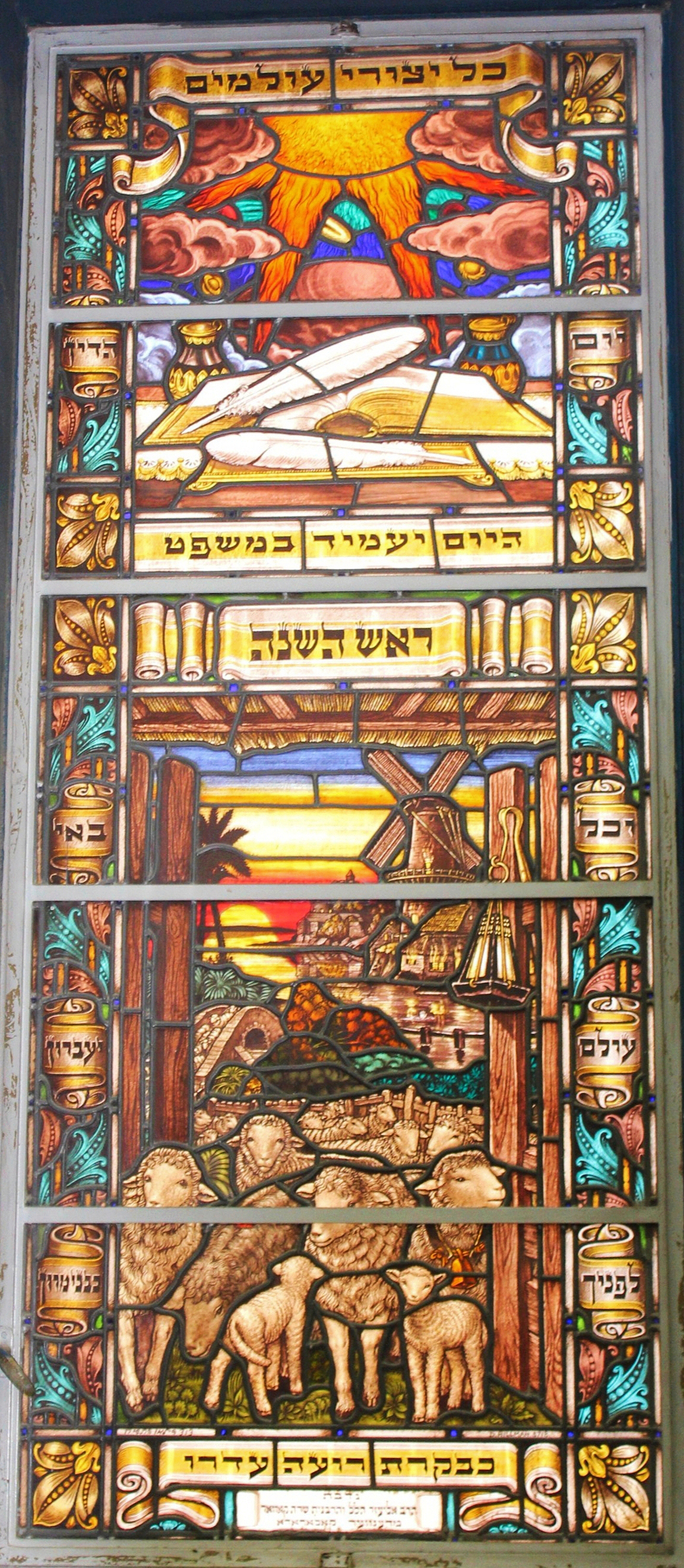
Rosh Hashanah symbolism, inspired by "Unetanneh Tokef", in a synagogue in Jerusalem

Rosh Hashanah is described in the Mishnah as a day when "creatures pass before [God] like sheep" (Rosh Hashanah 1:2), receiving their judgment. The Talmud expands on this, with tractate Rosh Hashanah 16a:6 noting that Rabbi Meir and Rabbi Yehudah, both Tannaim from the second century CE during the Mishnaic period, agree that humanity is judged on Rosh Hashanah. Furthermore, the Talmud, citing the opinion of Rabbi Kruspedai—who in turn attributes his opinion to Rabbi Yochanan—in Rosh Hashanah 16b:12, states that three books of judgment are opened on Rosh Hashanah. The books are inscribed with the fates of the individuals' names: one for the completely wicked, a second for the wholly righteous, and a third for those in an intermediate moral state, all judged by God. The names of the entirely righteous are immediately inscribed in the book of the living (Biblical Hebrew: ספר החיים, romanized: Sefer HaḤayyim) and they are sealed "for life". The intermediate group is given ten days until Yom Kippur to reflect, repent, and become righteous; the wicked are "blotted out of the book of the living," teaches Rabbi Avin, referencing Psalm 69:29.

Some midrashic descriptions depict God sitting upon a throne before open books containing the deeds of all humanity, with each person passing before God for evaluation of their deeds. Rosh Hashanah, along with Yom Kippur, was identified as an anniversary holiday to "reflect on the past [...] only for the sake of the future" by Chief Rabbi of the United Hebrew Congregations of the Commonwealth Ephraim Mirvis on 7 October 2024. The general understanding of the holiday's religious significance is that it marks a period when members of the Jewish community can atone for their personal sins from the past year. This period begins ten days before Yom Kippur, which is dedicated to communal reflection and repentance. This is reflected in the prayers composed by classical rabbinic sages for Rosh Hashanah, which are included in contemporary traditional High Holy Day machzorim (מַחְזוֹרִים, Hebrew pronunciation: [maχzoˈʁim]; sing. machzor) The overarching theme of the prayers is the "coronation" of God as King of the universe, in preparation for the acceptance of judgments that will follow on that day. For instance, page 15 of the ArtScroll machzor for Rosh Hashanah reads:

The Holy One said, "On Rosh Hashanah recite before Me [verses of] Sovereignty, Remembrance, and Shofar blasts (malchuyot, zichronot, shofarot): Sovereignty so that you should make Me your King; Remembrance so that your remembrance should rise up before Me. And through what? Through the Shofar" (Rosh Hashanah 16a, 34b).

According to Jewish mysticism, Rosh Hashanah is the day in which the life-force of the world is renewed. It is the day that God so to speak decides if the world should continue to exist for another year. The Shofar's blows symbolize our plea to God to renew the lease on the world.

== Shofar blowing ==
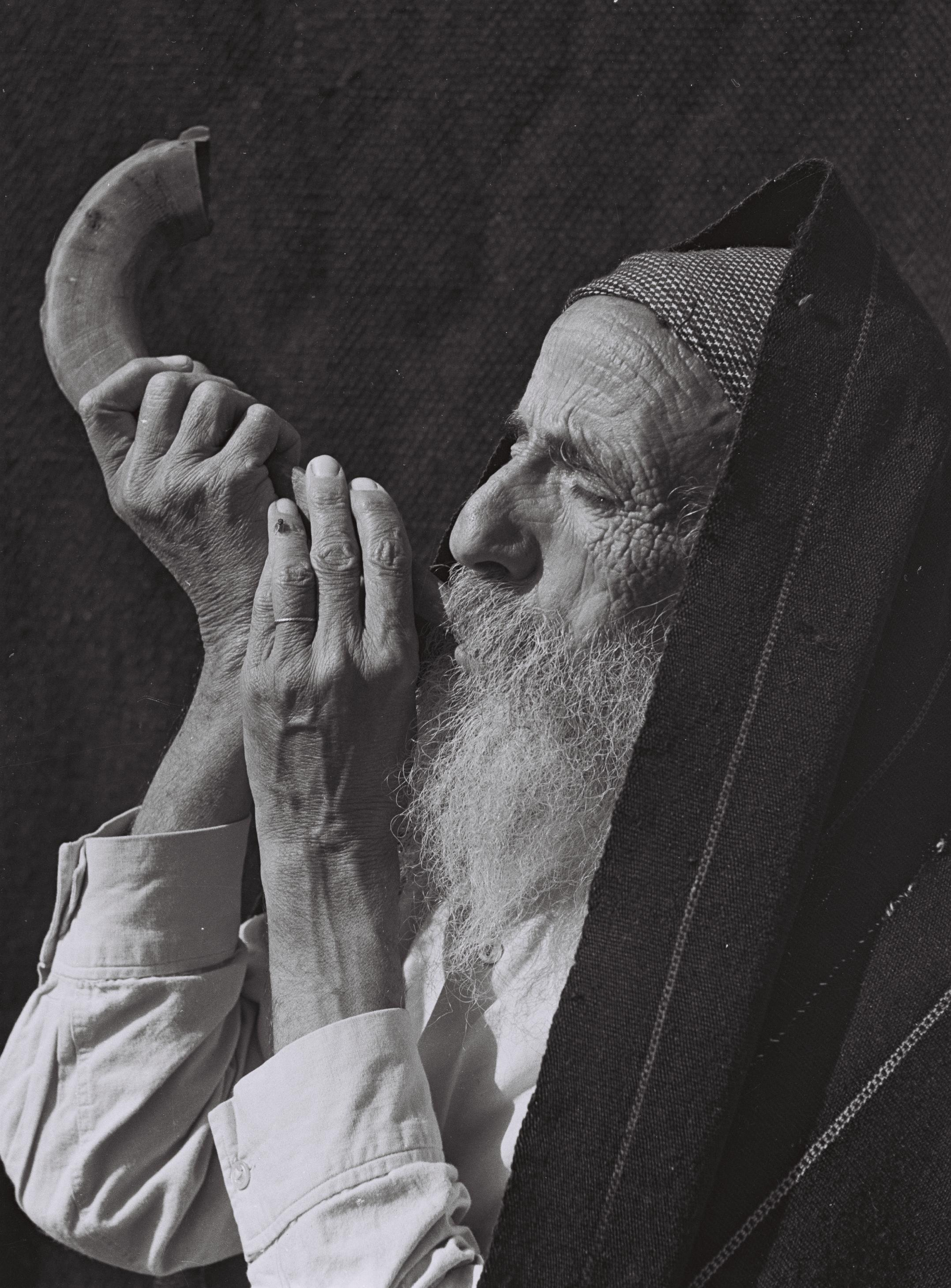
Jewish elder blowing the ram's horn (shofar)

Sequence of shofar sounds: tekiah, shevarim, teruah, tekiah

The best-known ritual of Rosh Hashanah is the blowing of the shofar, a musical instrument made from an animal horn. The shofar is blown at various points during the Rosh Hashanah prayers, and it is customary in most communities to have a total of 100 blasts on each day. The shofar is not blown on Shabbat.

While the blowing of the shofar is a Biblical statute, it is also a symbolic "wake-up call", stirring Jews to mend their ways and repent. The shofar blasts call out: "Sleepers, wake up from your slumber! Examine your ways and repent and remember your Creator." The blowing of the shofar is also seen as a reminder to God of the plight of humanity.

In modern times the Lubavitcher Rebbe made the Shofar blowing into the theme of a global campaign to encourage and facilitate the hearing of the Shofar in public areas and underserviced places such as prisons and hospitals.

== Prayer service ==
"Avinu Malkenu" ("Our Father, Our King")

On Rosh Hashanah day, religious poems called piyyutim are added to the regular services. A special prayer book, the machzor (plural machzorim), is used on Rosh Hashanah and Yom Kippur. Some additions are made to the regular service, most notably in the Ashkenazic rite (both Nusach Ashkenaz and Nusach Sefard) an extended repetition of the Amidah prayer for both Shacharit and Mussaf including piyyutim; even communities that omit most piyyutim throughout the year recite some selection of these piyyutim. In the contemporary Sephardic rite, no piyyutim are recited inside the repetition, and in the Italian rite very few are recited, but many Sephardic communities recite piyyutim before or after the Torah reading. The shofar is blown during Mussaf at the conclusion of each of the middle blessing of the Chazzan's repetition; in some communities, it is also blown during the silent Musaf. (In many synagogues, even little children come and hear the shofar being blown.). The Aleinu prayer is recited during the silent prayer as well as the repetition of the Mussaf Amidah.

Among the most well-known and widely recited liturgical poems (piyyutim) in all Jewish communities is Unetaneh Tokef, traditionally recited around the Musaf prayer on Rosh Hashanah and Yom Kippur.

The special Avinu Malkeinu prayer is also recited on Rosh Hashanah. In the Ashkenazic rite, Avinu Malkeinu is never recited on Shabbat (except in Ne'ila on Yom Kippur), and it is also omitted at Mincha on Fridays.

The narrative in the Book of Genesis describing the announcement of Isaac's birth and his subsequent birth is part of the Torah readings in synagogues on the first day of Rosh Hashanah, and the narrative of the sacrifice and binding of Isaac is read in synagogue on the second day of Rosh Hashanah.

The Mussaf Amidah prayer on Rosh Hashanah is unique in that, apart from the first and last three blessings, it contains three central blessings making a total of nine. These blessings are entitled "Malchuyot" (Kingship, and also includes the blessing for the holiness of the day as in a normal Mussaf), "Zichronot" (Remembrance), and "Shofarot" (concerning the shofar). Each section contains an introductory paragraph followed by selections of verses about the "topic". The verses are three from the Torah, three from the Ketuvim, three from the Nevi'im, and one more from the Torah. During the repetition of the Amidah, the shofar is sounded (except on Shabbat) after the blessing that ends each section. Recitation of these three blessings is first recorded in the Mishna, though writings by Philo and possibly even Psalms 81 suggest that the blessings may have been recited on Rosh Hashanah even centuries earlier.

In many Ashkenazic communities, primarily those from Germany or Hungary, a kittel is worn during daytime Rosh Hashanah prayers, just as one is worn on Yom Kippur. In other Ashkenazic communities, only the prayer leaders wear a kittel on Rosh Hashanah.

== Customs ==
=== Days before Rosh Hashanah ===
Rosh Hashanah is preceded by the month of Elul, during which religious Jews traditionally undergo a period of self-examination and repentance—a process that culminates in the ten days of the Yamim Nora'im, beginning with Rosh Hashanah and ending with the holiday of Yom Kippur.

The shofar is traditionally blown on weekday mornings—and in some communities in the afternoon, too—for the entire month of Elul. The sound of the shofar is intended to awaken the hearers from their "slumbers" and alert them to the coming days of judgment. The shofar is not blown on Shabbat.

Penitential prayers called selichot are recited in the period leading up to Rosh Hashanah. The Sephardic tradition is to start at the beginning of Elul, while the Ashkenazic and Italian practice is to start a few days before Rosh Hashanah.

The day before Rosh Hashanah is known as Erev Rosh Hashanah (Rosh Hashanah eve). It is the 29th day of the Hebrew month of Elul, ending at sundown, when Rosh Hashanah commences. Some communities perform hatarat nedarim (a nullification of vows) after the morning prayer services. Many Orthodox men immerse in a mikveh to spiritually purify themselves ahead of Rosh Hashanah.

=== Symbolic foods ===
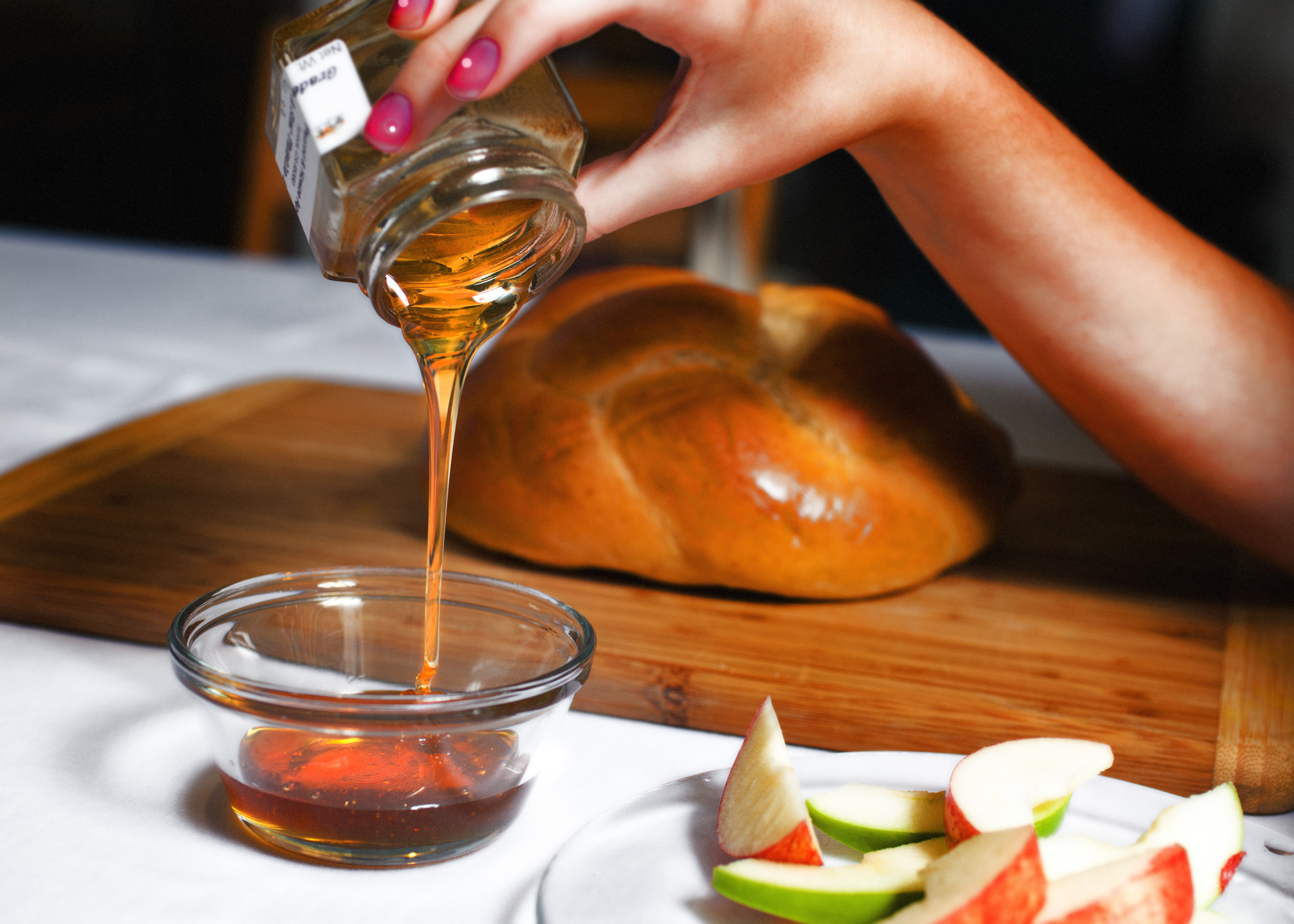
Apples dipped in honey are eaten on Rosh Hashanah to symbolise the wish for a sweet and happy new year

Rosh Hashanah meals usually include apples dipped in honey to symbolize a sweet start to the new year, which was a medieval addition to the holiday's customs. Other foods with symbolic meanings may be served, depending on local minhagim ("customs"), such as the head of a fish to symbolize the prayer "let us be the head and not the tail", derived from Deuteronomy 28:13.

Many communities hold a "Rosh Hashanah seder" during which blessings are recited over a variety of symbolic dishes. The blessings have the incipit "Yehi ratzon", meaning "May it be Thy will." In many cases, the name of the food in Hebrew or Aramaic represents a play on words (a pun). The Yehi Ratzon platter may include apples (dipped in honey, baked or cooked as a compote called mansanada); dates; pomegranates; black-eyed peas; pumpkin-filled pastries called rodanchas; leek fritters called keftedes de prasa; beets; and a whole fish with the head intact. It is also common among Sephardim to eat stuffed vegetables called legumbres yaprakes.

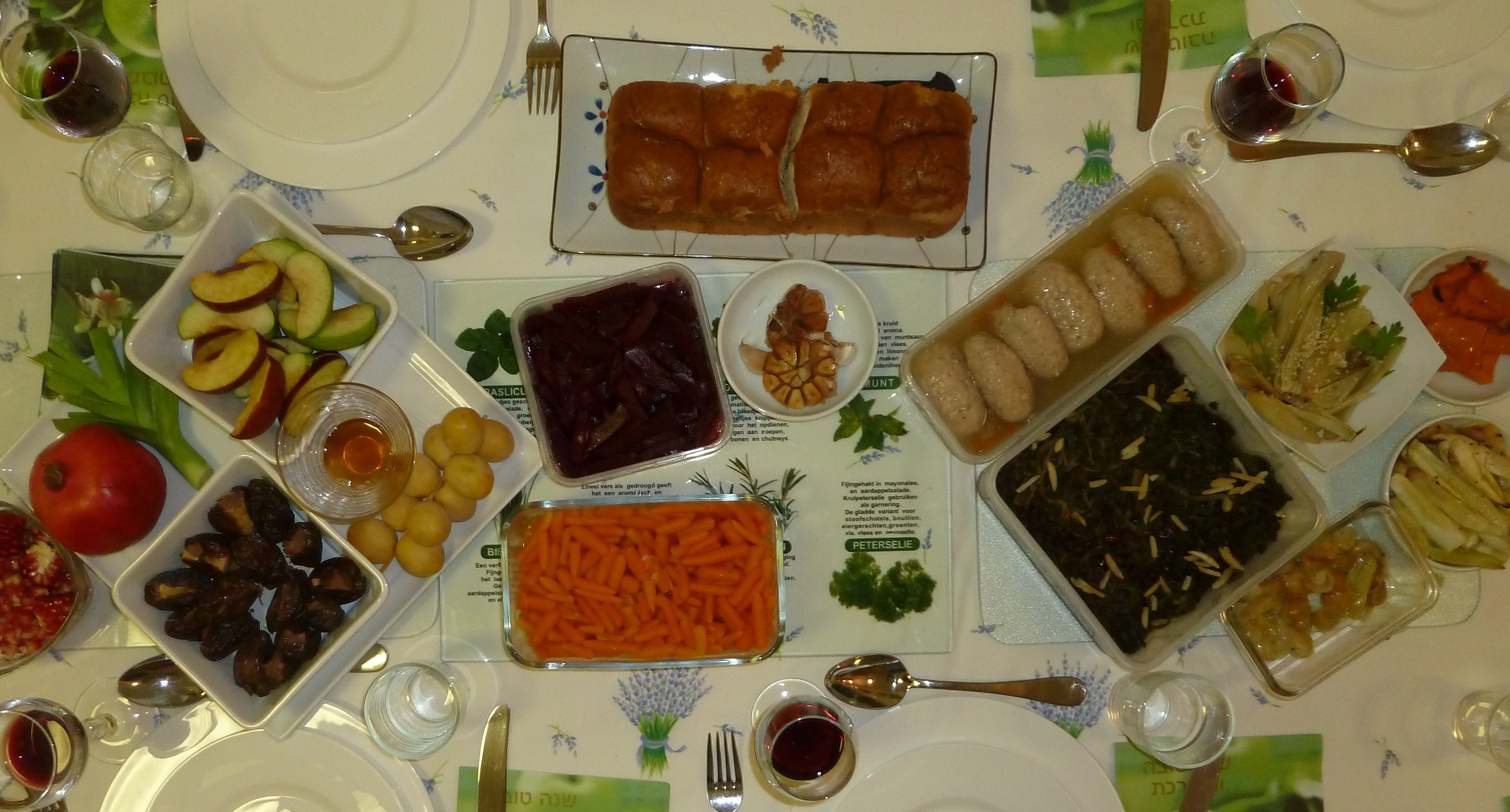
Traditional Rosh Hashanah foods: apples and honey, dates, pomegranates, leeks, sweet carrots, spinach, gefilte fish and more

Some of the symbolic foods eaten are dates, black-eyed peas, leeks, spinach, and gourd, all of which are mentioned in the Talmud: "Let a man be accustomed to eat on New Year's Day gourds (קרא), and fenugreek (רוביא), leeks (כרתי), beet [leaves] (סילקא), and dates (תמרי)."

Carrots can have multiple symbolic meanings at the Rosh Hashanah table. The Yiddish word for carrot is ma’rin (מערין), which also means "increase." By eating carrots, one asks for their merits and blessings to be increased. Sliced carrots are also typically eaten to symbolize gold coins and hopes for continued wealth and prosperity. In Hebrew, the word for carrot is gezer (גזר), which sounds similar to the word g’zar – the Hebrew word for "decree." Serving carrots on Rosh Hashanah symbolizes a desire to have God nullify any negative decrees.

Pomegranates are used in many traditions to symbolize being fruitful, like the pomegranate with its many seeds. Typically, round challah bread is served, to symbolize the cycle of the year. Raisins are occasionally incorporated into the dough to symbolize a sweet New Year. From ancient to quite modern age, lamb head or fish head were served. Nowadays, lekach (honey cake) and gefilte fish are commonly served by Ashkenazic Jews on this holiday. On the second night, new fruits are served to warrant the inclusion of the shehecheyanu blessing.

The general Ashkenazic custom is eating sweet foods, such as honey cake and teiglach, to celebrate a sweet year. The Sephardic and Mizrahi custom is frequently to eat light-coloured foods, or rather, to avoid dark ones or a dark year.

=== Tashlikh ===
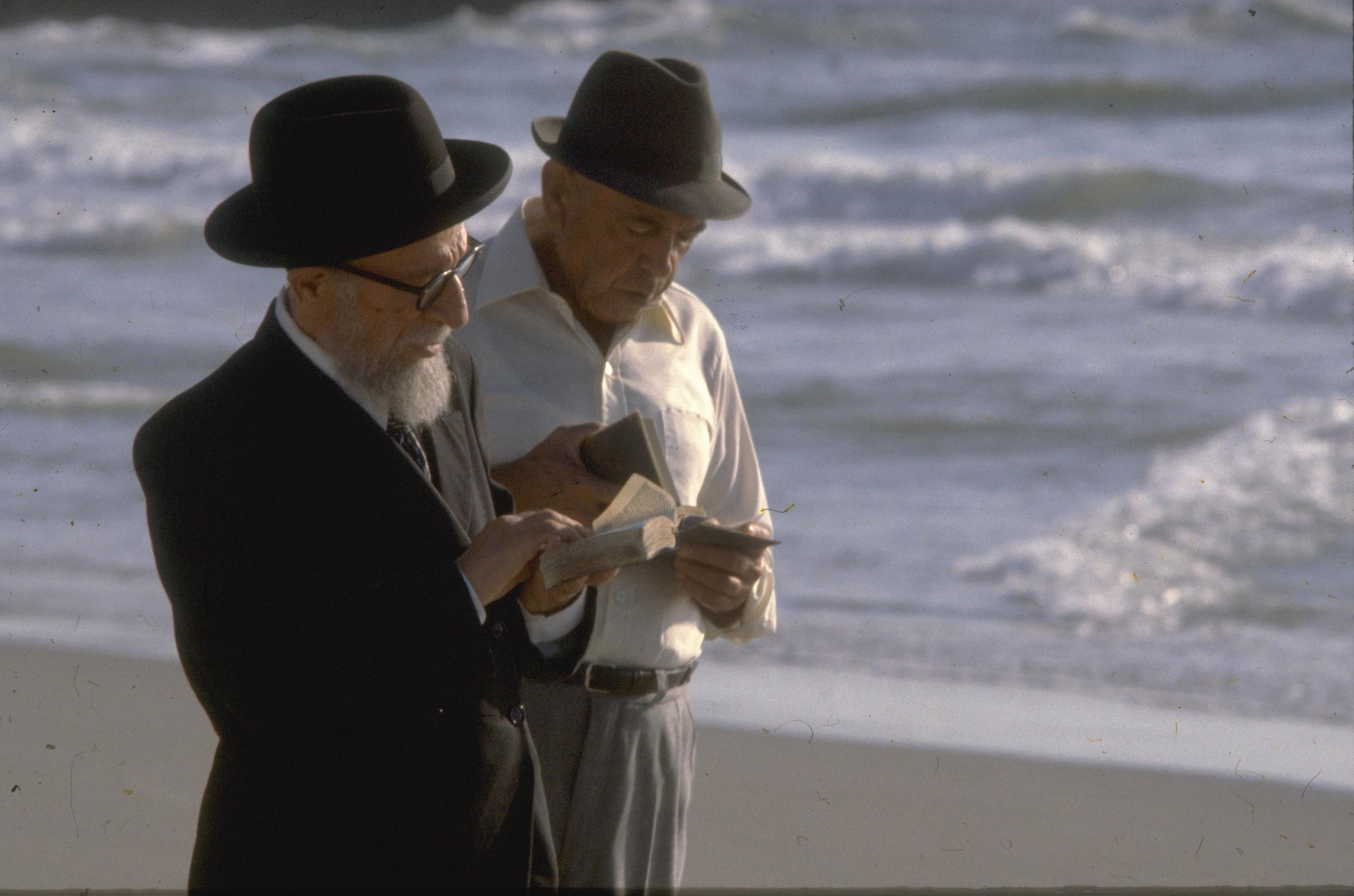
Tashlikh in Tel Aviv during Rosh Hashanah, 1980

The ritual of tashlikh is performed on the afternoon of the first day of Rosh Hashanah by most Ashkenazic and Sephardic Jews (but not by Spanish and Portuguese Jews or some Yemenites, as well as those who follow the practices of the Vilna Gaon). Prayers are recited near natural flowing water, and one's sins are symbolically cast into the water. Many also have the custom to throw bread or pebbles into the water, to symbolize the "casting off" of sins.

In some communities (primarily Ashkenazim), if the first day of Rosh Hashanah occurs on Shabbat, tashlikh is postponed until the second day. The traditional service for tashlikh is recited individually and includes the prayer "Who is like unto you, O God... And You will cast all their sins into the depths of the sea", and Biblical passages including Isaiah 11:9 ("They will not injure nor destroy in all My holy mountain, for the earth shall be as full of the knowledge of the Lord as the waters cover the sea") and Psalms 118:5–9, Psalms 121 and Psalms 130, as well as personal prayers. Though once considered a solemn individual tradition, it has become an increasingly social ceremony practiced in groups. Tashlikh can be performed any time until Hoshana Rabba, and some Hasidic communities perform Tashlikh on the day before Yom Kippur.

=== Greetings ===
The common Hebrew greeting offered on Rosh Hashanah is Shanah Tovah (Hebrew: שנה טובה; pronounced [ˈʃona ˈtɔ͡ɪva] in many Ashkenazic communities and pronounced [ʃaˈna toˈva] in Israeli and Sephardic communities), which translated from Hebrew means "[have a] good year". Often Shanah Tovah Umetukah (Hebrew: שנה טובה ומתוקה), meaning "[have a] Good and Sweet Year", is used. In Yiddish the greeting is אַ גוט יאָר "a gut yor" ("a good year") or אַ גוט געבענטשט יאָר "a gut gebentsht yor" ("a good blessed year"). The formal Sephardic greeting is Tizku Leshanim Rabbot ("may you merit many years"), to which the answer is Ne'imot VeTovot ("pleasant and good ones"); while in Ladino, they say אנייאדה בואינה, דולסי אי אליגרי "anyada buena, dulse i alegre" ("may you have a good, sweet and happy New Year").

A more formal greeting commonly used among religiously observant Jews is Ketivah VaChatimah Tovah (Hebrew: כְּתִיבָה וַחֲתִימָה טוֹבָה), which translates as "A good inscription and sealing [in the Book of Life]", or L'shanah tovah tikatevu v'techatemu meaning "May you be inscribed and sealed for a good year". In many German communities, the greeting L'shanah tovah tikatevu, "May you be inscribed for a good year" is used, leaving out the sealing. After Rosh Hashanah ends, the greeting is changed to G'mar chatimah tovah (Hebrew: גמר חתימה טובה) meaning "A good final sealing", until Yom Kippur. After Yom Kippur is over, until Hoshana Rabbah, as Sukkot ends, the greeting is Gmar Tov (Hebrew: גְּמָר טוֹב), "a good conclusion".

=== In Karaite Judaism ===
Unlike the denominations of Rabbinical Judaism, Karaite Judaism believes the Jewish New Year starts with the first month and celebrates this holiday only as mentioned in the Torah, a day of rejoicing and shouting. Karaites allow no work on the day except what is needed to prepare food (Leviticus 23:23, 24).

=== In Samaritanism ===
Samaritans preserve the biblical name of the holiday, Yom Teruah, and do not consider the day a New Year's Day.

== Duration and timing ==
The Torah defines Rosh Hashanah as a one-day celebration, and since days in the Hebrew calendar begin at sundown, the beginning of Rosh Hashanah is at sundown at the end of 29 Elul. Since the time of the destruction of the Second Temple of Jerusalem in 70 CE and the time of Rabban Yohanan ben Zakkai, normative Jewish law appears to be that Rosh Hashanah is to be celebrated for two days, because of the difficulty of determining the date of the new moon. Nonetheless, there is some evidence that Rosh Hashanah was celebrated on a single day in Israel as late as the thirteenth century CE.

Orthodox and Conservative Judaism now generally observe Rosh Hashanah for the first two days of Tishrei, even in Israel, where all other Jewish holidays are dated from the new moon and last only one day. The two days of Rosh Hashanah are said to constitute "Yoma Arichtah" (Aramaic: "one long day"), with certain practical implications in Halacha. In Reform Judaism, while most congregations in North America observe only the first day of Rosh Hashanah, some follow the traditional two-day observance as a sign of solidarity with other Jews worldwide. Karaite Jews, who do not recognize Rabbinic Jewish oral law and rely on their own understanding of the Torah, observe only one day on the first of Tishrei, since the second day is not mentioned in the Written Torah.

=== Date ===
Originally, the date of Rosh Hashanah was determined based on observation of the new moon ("molad"), and thus could fall on any day of the week. However, around the third century CE, the Hebrew calendar was fixed such that the first day of Rosh Hashanah never fell on Wednesday or Friday, and by the ninth century it had been fixed so that it also could not fall out on Sunday (lo AD'U rosh).

Rosh Hashanah occurs 163 days after the first day of Passover, and thus is usually (but not always) determined by the new moon closest to the autumnal equinox.

Regarding the Gregorian calendar, the earliest date on which Rosh Hashanah can fall is 5 September, as happened in 1842, 1861, 1899, and 2013. The latest Gregorian date that Rosh Hashanah can occur is 5 October, as happened in 1815, 1929, and 1967, and will happen again in 2043. After 2089, the differences between the Hebrew and Gregorian calendars will result in Rosh Hashanah falling no earlier than 6 September. Starting in 2214, the latest date will be 6 October.

In 2020, Ukrainian president Volodymyr Zelenskyy, himself a Jew, announced that Ukraine would declare Rosh Hashanah a national holiday. As of 2024, however, Rosh Hashanah still is not a public holiday in Ukraine.

== Gallery of Rosh Hashanah greeting cards ==
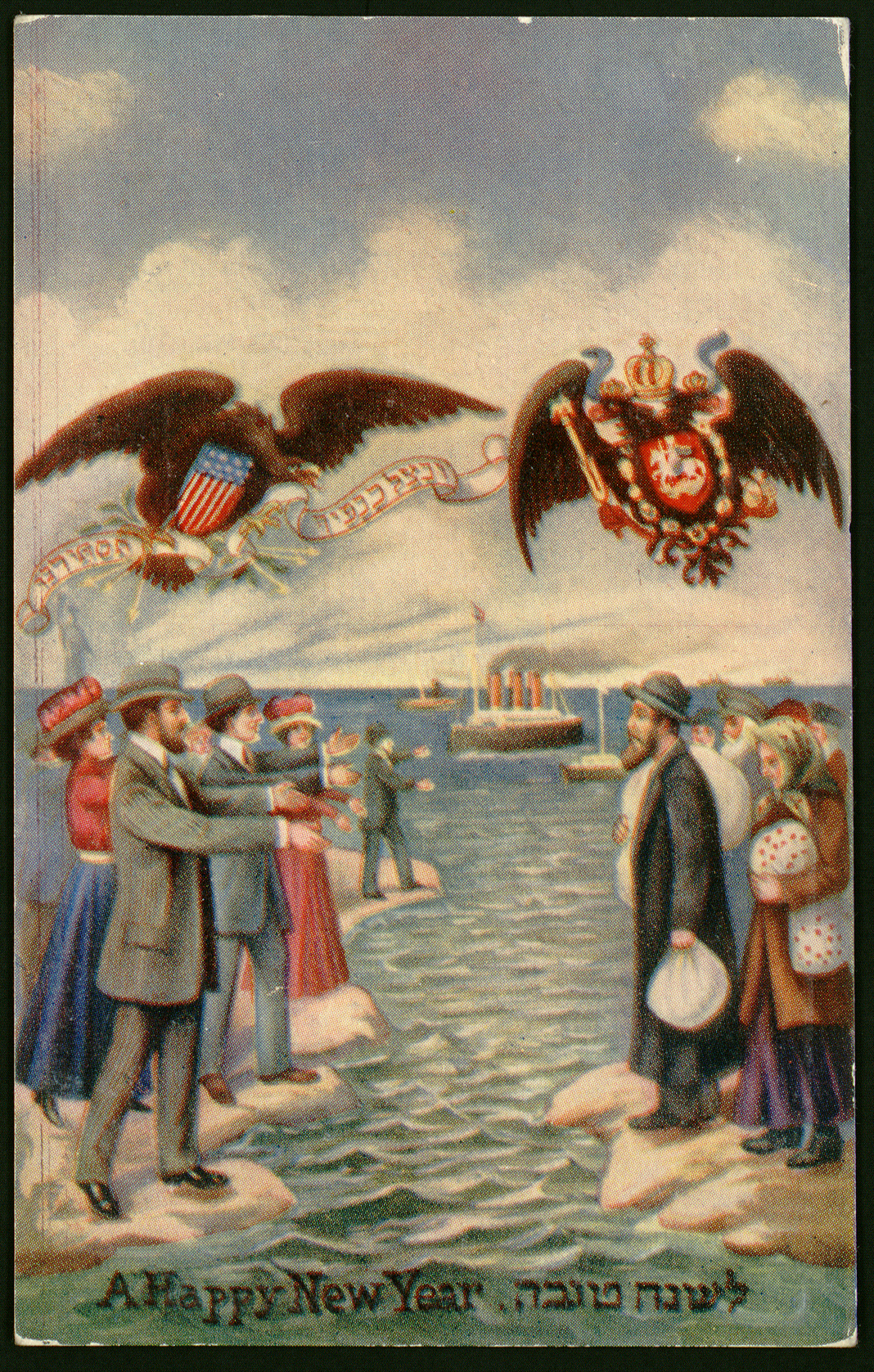
United States, 1900

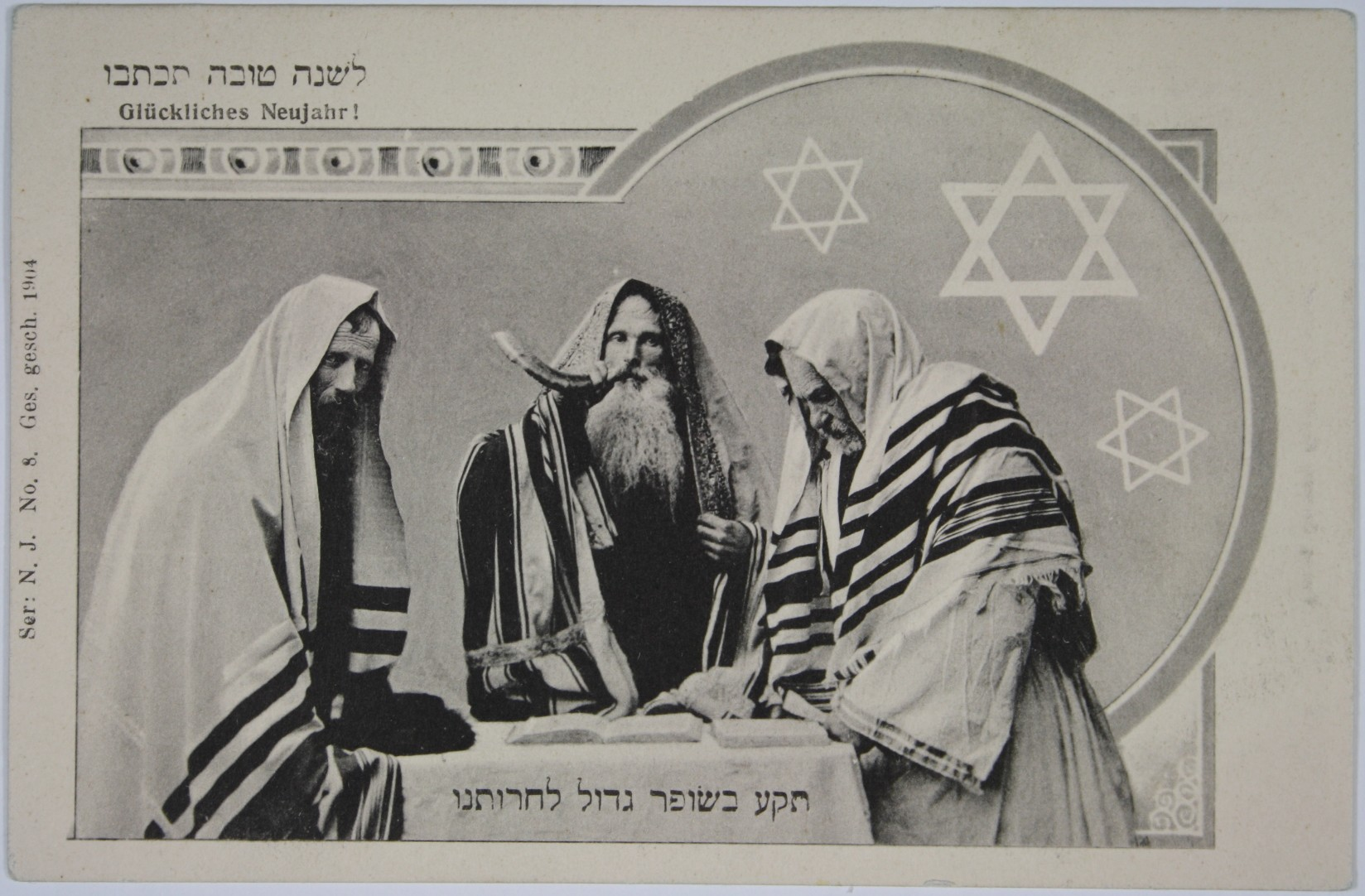
Austria, 1904

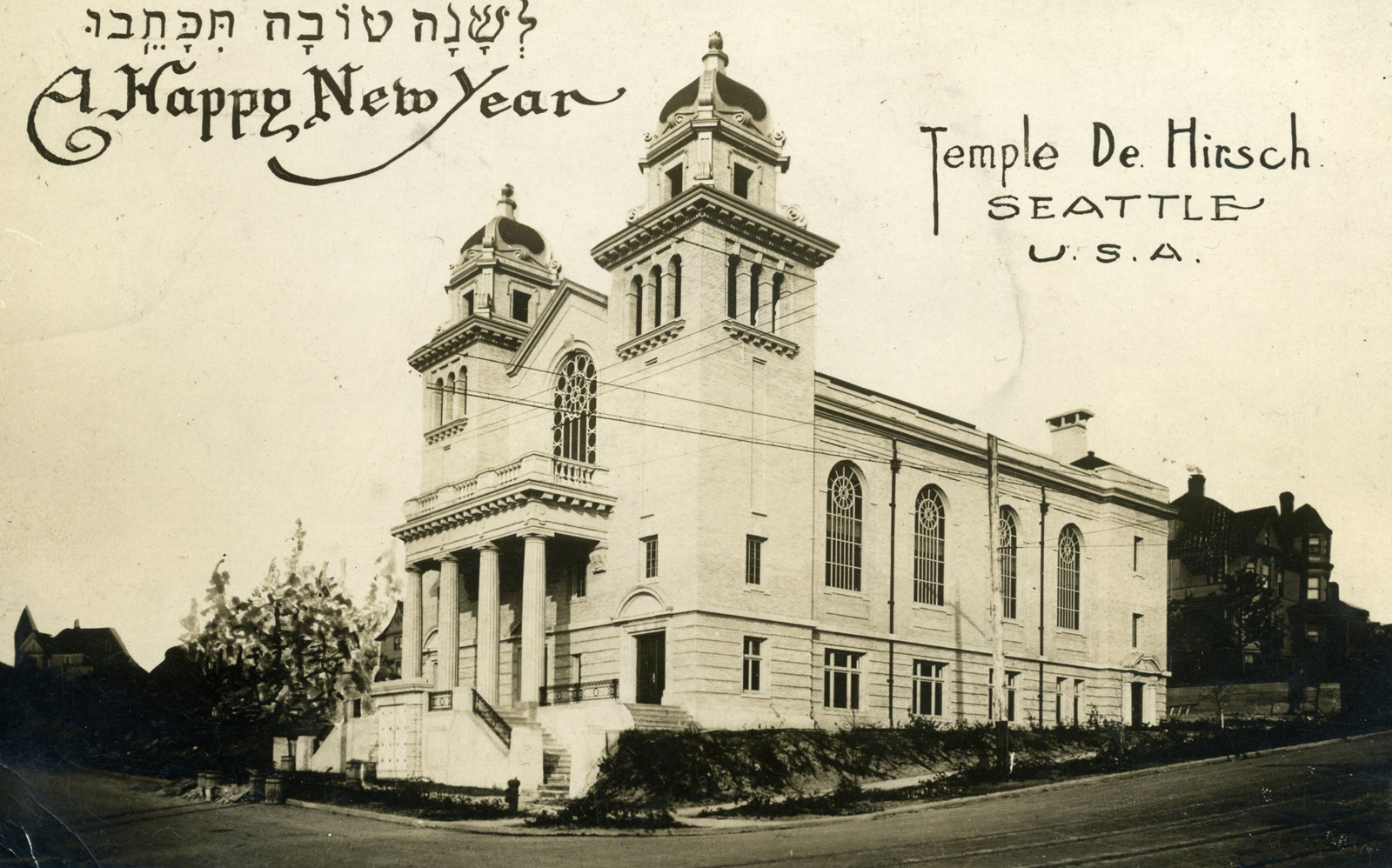
United States, 1908

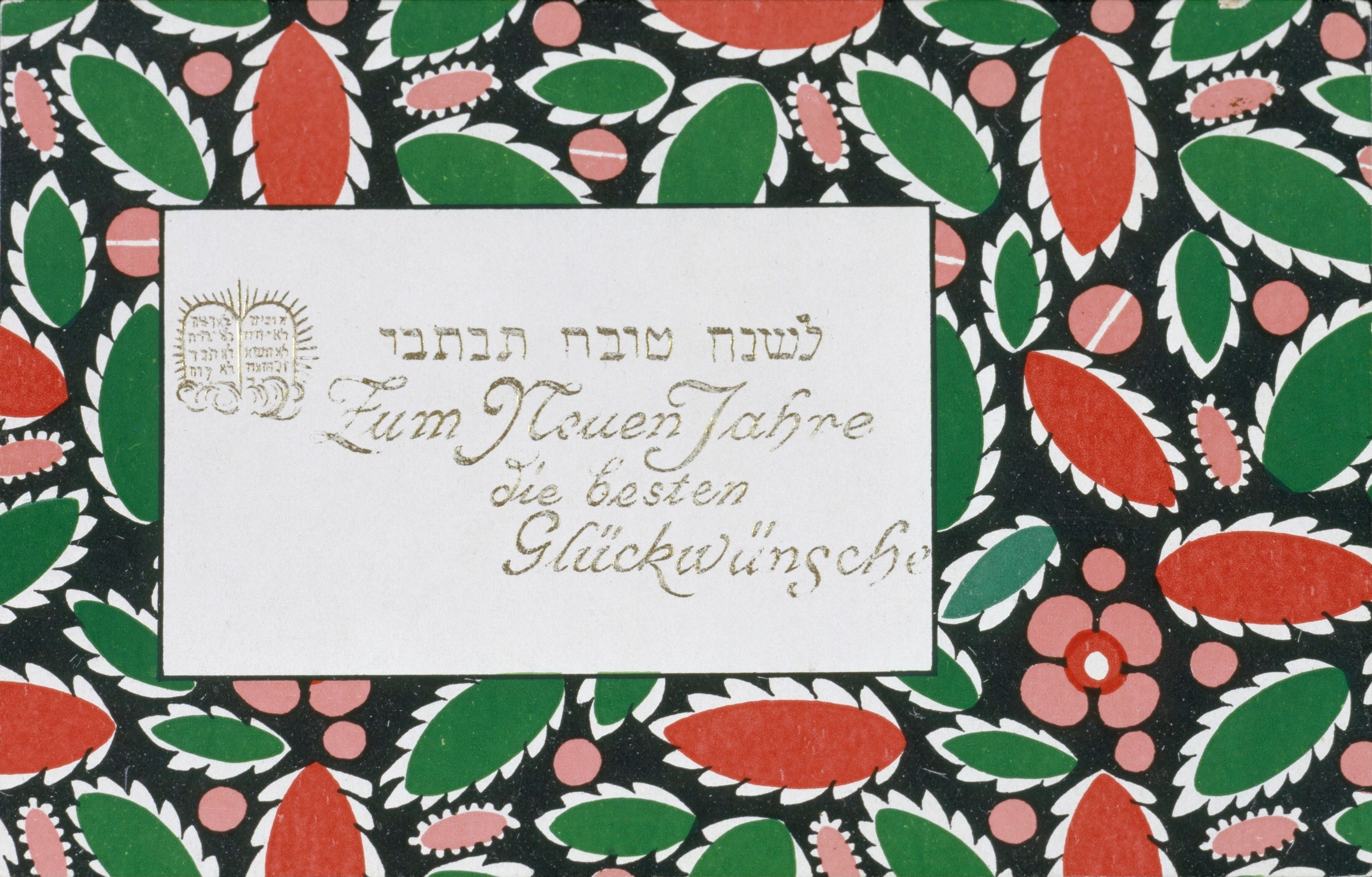
Austria, 1910 (Wiener Werkstätte)

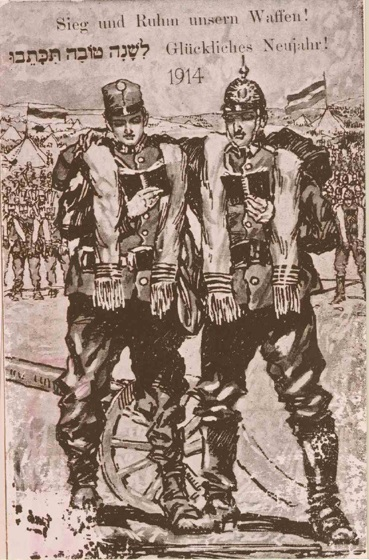
Austria-Hungary/
Germany, 1914

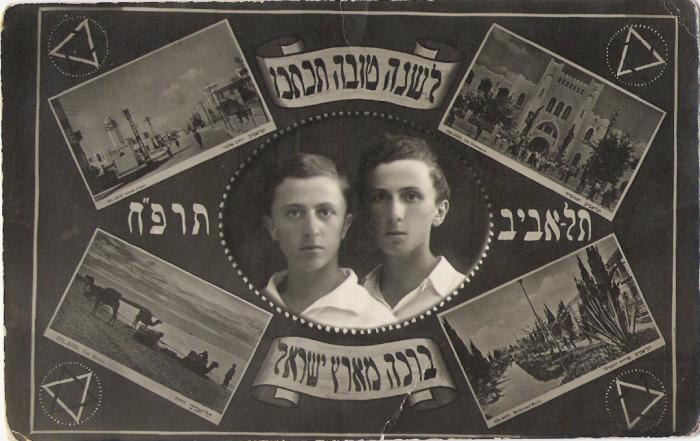
Tel Aviv, 1927

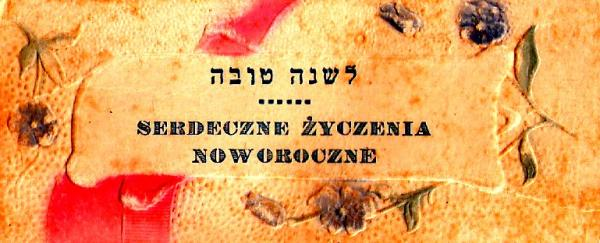
Poland, 1931

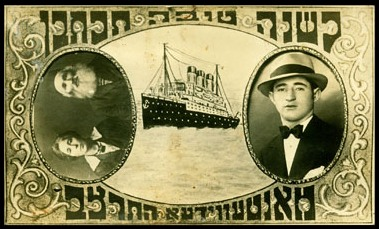
Montevideo, 1932

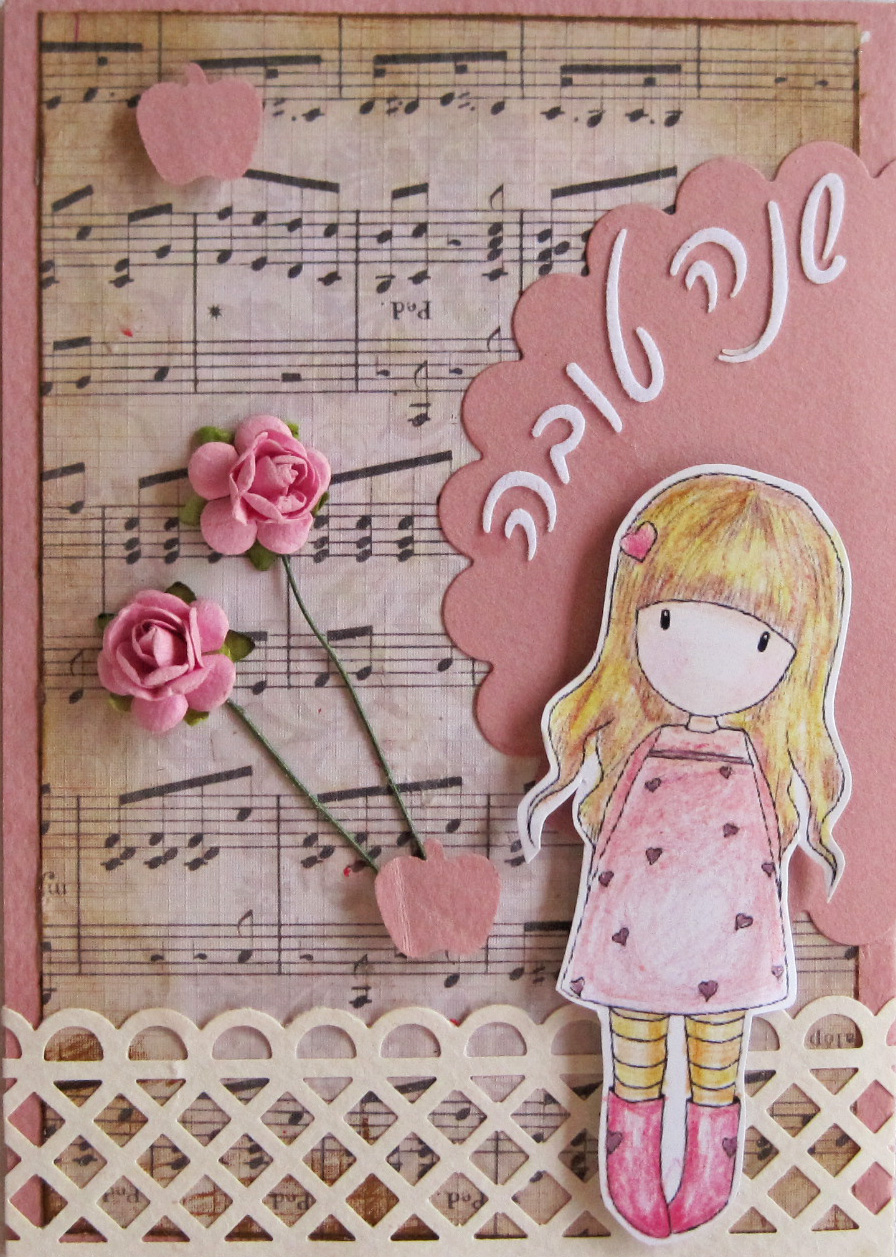
Israel, 2012

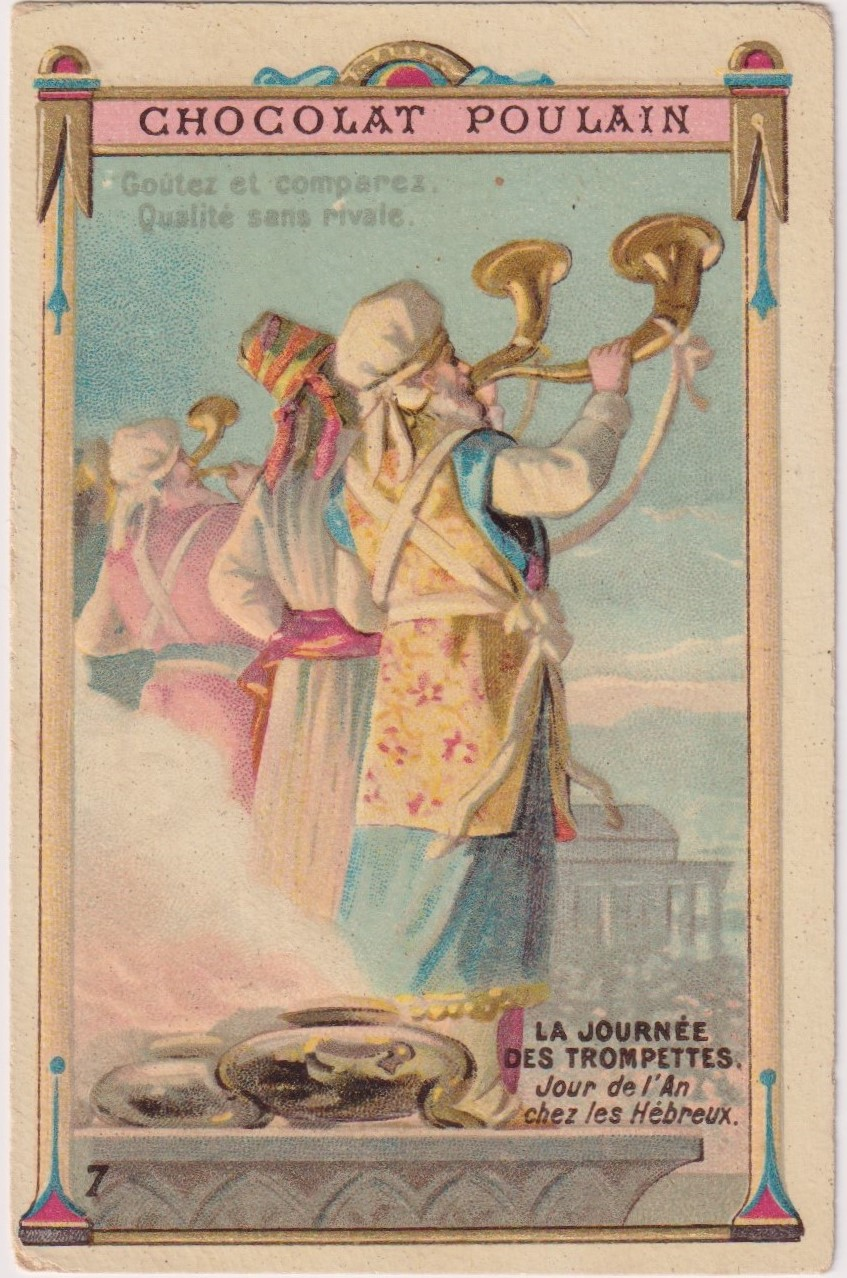
France, undated. (Jewish Museum of Switzerland.)

== See also ==
- Christian observances of Jewish holidays: Feast of Trumpets
- Jewish holidays
- Rosh Hashana kibbutz – Large prayer assemblage of Breslover Hasidim held on the Jewish New Year
- Unetanneh Tokef – Jewish liturgical poem

== Bibliography ==
- Angel, Marc (2000). Exploring Sephardic Customs and Traditions. Hoboken, NJ: KTAV Pub. House in association with American Sephardi Federation, American Sephardi Federation – South Florida Chapter, Sephardic House. ISBN 0-88125-675-7.
