= Avodah (Yom Kippur) =

Central religious poem of the Yom Kippur Musaf service

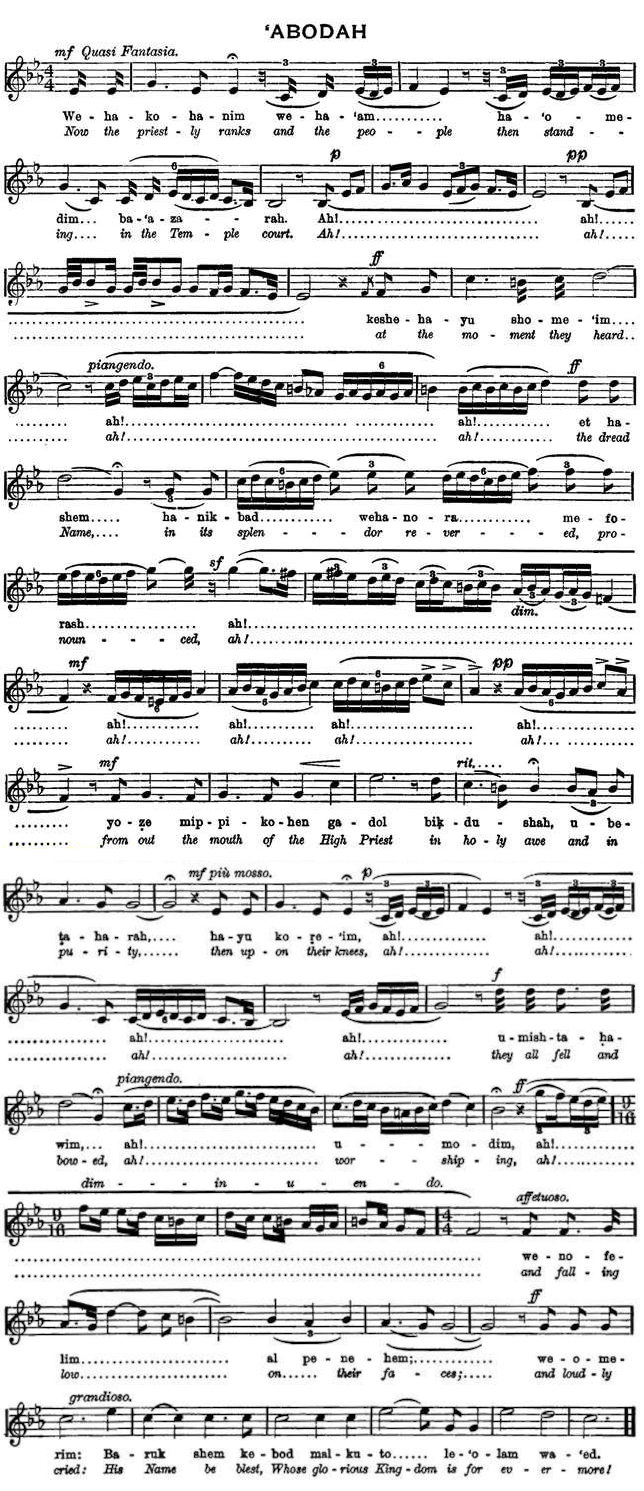
Music of the Avodah service

The Avodah (Hebrew: עֲבוֹדָה, lit. 'service') is a poetic description of the Yom Kippur Temple service. It is recited as part of the Mussaf service of Yom Kippur, and is often considered one of the most solemn and impressive portions of the Yom Kippur prayer service. Different poems (all sharing the same structure) are recited in different communities, for example Amitz Koach among most Ashkenazi Jews and Atah Konanta among most Sephardic Jews.

== Content ==
=== Historical introduction ===
The Avodah usually begins with a prayer for the synagogue reader, followed by a selective review of the Biblical history from Adam down to Aaron. A number of reasons have been suggested for the addition of this historical introduction:

- It recalls the maamadot, in which the priestly Temple service was accompanied by an assembly of ordinary Jews who would gather and recite the creation story of Genesis 1; similarly, here description of the Temple service is paired with description of creation.
- It recalls the structure of Jewish prayer, in which requests are often prefaced by appeals to history, specifically to the Patriarchs and their merit
- It suggests that the performance of the Yom Kippur Temple service is of cosmic importance, similar in importance to the creation of the world, or else the purpose of that creation.

One Avodah text composed by Moses ibn Ezra is notable for beginning with the giving of the Torah, rather than with creation.

=== Temple service ===
Then the whole Yom Kippur Temple service is described in detail: the preparation of the High Priest during seven days preceding the festival, the appointment of a substitute to meet the emergency of the High Priest's becoming disqualified, the preparation of the holy vessels, the offering of the regular morning sacrifice, the baths and ablutions of the High Priest, his different changes of garments, and the scapegoat ritual.

During the recitation of the Avodah, Jews "imagine themselves in place of the priests when the Temple stood". As such, the custom is for worshippers to bow down on the ground at specific points in the recitation, and to recite the confessions along with the prayer leader. Some individuals have other customs, such as hand gestures to mime the sprinkling of blood (one sprinkling upwards and seven downwards per set of eight).

=== Additional prayers ===
The prayer of the High Priest after the completion of the service is then recited. Next is the Mareh Kohen poem, a glowing description of the splendor of the High Priest upon finishing his Temple service. This poem strongly resembles the description of the High Priest in the Book of Sirach (Sirach 50), and apparently was influenced by that passage.

Then follows the declaration "Happy is the eye which saw all this. When the ear hears it, is our soul not aggrieved?" A series of prayers lamenting the destruction of the Temple, the exile, and the distancing from God are then recited. The service closes with ardent prayers for the re-establishment of the Temple service.

== History ==
The recitation on Yom Kippur of a detailed description of the Temple service is already mentioned in the Talmud. Modern scholars suggest that it may date earlier: according to some, such a recitation was already customary in the Second Temple period; others suggest that the custom of synagogue recitation evolved later, but that it is based on the High Priest's recitation of Leviticus 16 in the Temple.

In the time of the Talmud, the recitation was probably based on the text of Mishnah tractate Yoma. One example of such a text is Shivat yamim, the oldest surviving Avodah text, which follows the Mishnah text while occasionally adding material from the Tosefta and Sifra. Nevertheless, from an early period the poets of the Land of Israel began to compose more original texts, in which most of the service is described in original poetic language rather than the Mishnah's language, and the entire passage is prefaced with an introduction recounting biblical history from creation, to the choice of Levi, to the choice of the High Priest to perform the service. The first such text, and the model for all later ones, was Atah Konanta, which is recited to this day among Sephardic and other congregations.

By the gaonic period the recitation was considered obligatory, and since then it has remained a part of the standard prayer service. In many communities it was recited not only in Mussaf, but also in the Shacharit and Mincha prayers, and in a few even in Maariv. In some communities, this practice lasted until the 14th century, but nowadays the recitation is only performed during Mussaf. In Yemenite Jewish custom, it is recited after Mussaf, as reciting it during Mussaf was considered an unacceptable interruption to the standard prayer text.

== Music ==
Among the northern Jews it was the function of the ḥazan not merely to lead the liturgical song of the congregation, but rather, by his singing, to interpret and elucidate the liturgy to the congregation. Even in medieval times the cantors were inspired by a subconscious sentiment of this kind, to voice in the Avodah all of Israel's longing for rest and liberty; and at times they would approach to the expression of sublimest emotion. Whenever the contrast between the servitude they knew and the glory they read of was more than usually keen, a particular intensity was lent to the Atonement liturgy; and there developed, probably before the modern period, a rhapsody replete with inarticulate vocalization. These main lines remained distinct under the growth of improvised cadences.

In the German and Polish rituals the verses of Meshullam ben Kalonymus are divided off into sections of irregular length at the six points where a quotation from the Scripture or the Talmud occurs. The quotations וכן היה אומר ("Thus did he say")—containing the confession of sin, first of the High Priest personally, then of the Aaronites, then of all Israel—and וכן היה מונה ("Thus did he count")—where Aaron counts the sprinklings on the altar—are chanted responsively, each phrase by cantor and congregation in rotation. Compositions of the modern masters have largely taken the place of the old plain-song chant, itself mainly a rising modulation and then a falling tone.

But the Talmudic passage commencing והכהנים ("Now the priests"), which occurs after each confession, and describes the scene when the Tetragrammaton was pronounced, reverses this order. It is first uttered by the congregation (usually led by some individual), who prostrate themselves when reciting the words describing that action. Then comes the turn of the ḥazan, who intones the passage. In this transcription the opportunity is afforded by the repetition of the melody to present both the chief forms of ornamental development, the first being rather German, the other rather Polish, in tradition. The cantor commences calmly to intone the words of the Mishnah in the major mode, but when describing the mystic solemnity of the scene in the Temple court, he breaks away into the strenuousness of the Oriental chromatic scale at the thought of the Divine Presence. He attempts a return to the calmness of the original key, but the thoughts conjured up by the words again overwhelm his intention, and drive him on to an ecstatic climax.
