= Mordecai Assaban =

Moroccan rabbi

Mordecai ben Isaac Assaban (Hebrew: מרדכי בן יצחק אצבאן, Mordekhai ben Yitḥzak Atzban; 1700, Meknes, Morocco – c. 1760, Aleppo, Ottoman Syria) was an 18th-century rabbi, posek, and Kabbalist.

He was chief rabbi of Leghorn, and emigrated to Jerusalem about 1729, where he dwelt for thirty years. He was the author of a viddui, entitled "Zobe'aḥ Todah."
