= Yom Kippur =

Holiest day in Judaism

Yom Kippur יוֹם כִּפּוּר
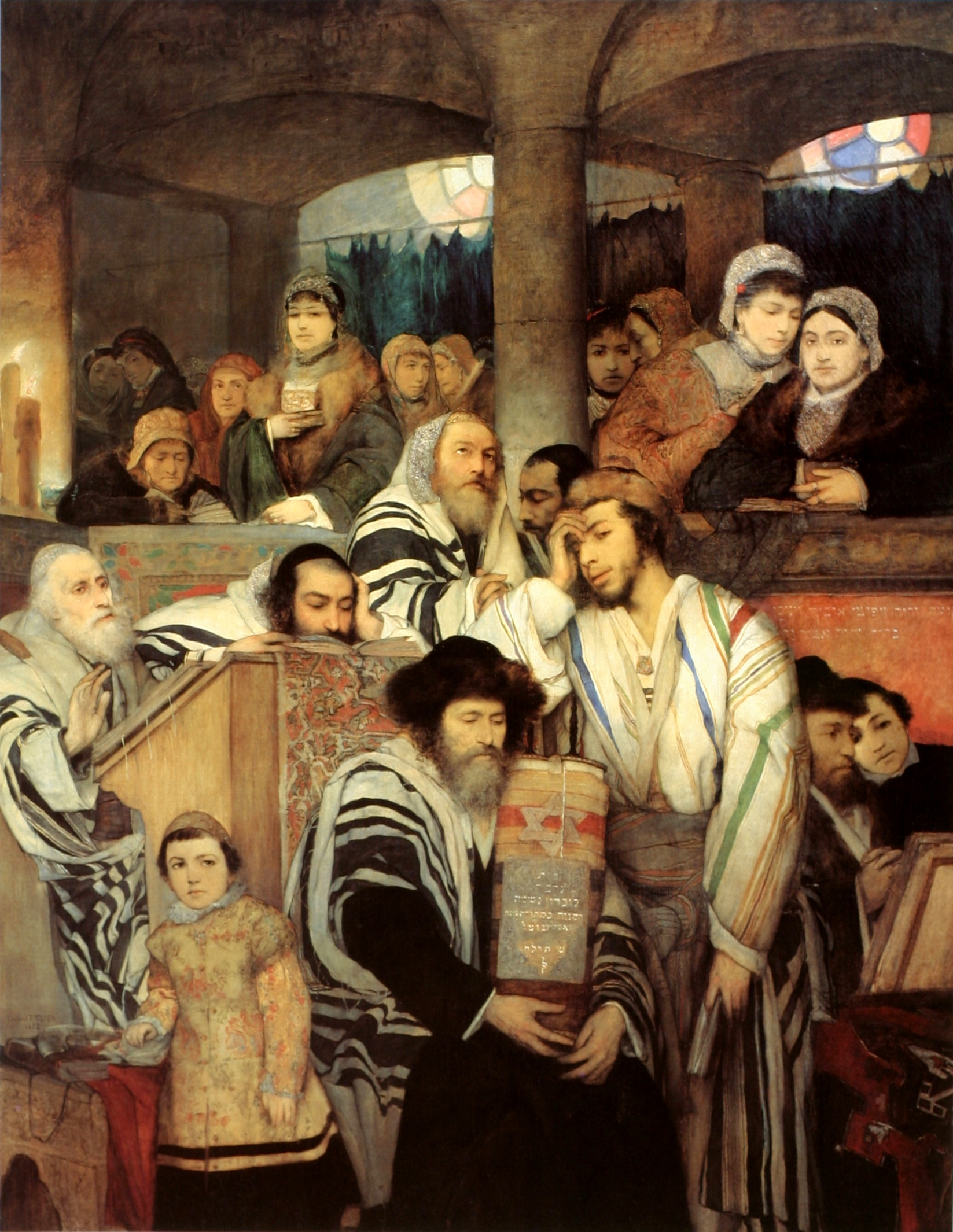
- Jews Praying in the Synagogue on Yom Kippur (1878) by Maurycy Gottlieb
- Observed by: Jews and Samaritans
- Type: Jewish, national (in Israel)
- Significance: Atonement and repentance to God for personal sins; sealing of one's fate for the upcoming year
- Observances: Fasting; prayer; asceticism
- Date: 10 Tishrei
- 2025 date: Sunset, 1 October – nightfall, 2 October
- 2026 date: Sunset, 20 September – nightfall, 21 September
- 2027 date: Sunset, 10 October – nightfall, 11 October
- 2028 date: Sunset, 29 September – nightfall, 30 September
- Duration: One day
- Frequency: Annual (Hebrew calendar)
- Related to: Rosh Hashanah

Yom Kippur (/ˌjɒm kɪˈpʊər, ˌjɔːm ˈkɪpər, ˌjoʊm-/ YOM kip-OOR, YAWM KIP-ər, YOHM-; Hebrew: יוֹם כִּפּוּר Yōm Kippūr [ˈjom kiˈpuʁ], lit. 'Day of Atonement') is the holiest day of the year in Judaism. It occurs annually on the 10th of Tishrei, in late September or early October.

For traditional Jewish people, Yom Kippur centers on atonement and repentance. The day's main observances consist of full fasting and asceticism, both accompanied by extended prayer services (usually at synagogue) and sin confessions. Some minor Jewish denominations, such as Reconstructionist Judaism, focus less on sins and more on one's goals and accomplishments and setting yearly intentions.

Alongside the related holiday of Rosh Hashanah, Yom Kippur is one of the two components of the High Holy Days of Judaism. It is also the last of the Ten Days of Repentance.

== Name ==
The formal Hebrew name of the holiday is Yom HaKippurim, 'day [of] the atonements'. This name is used in the Bible, Mishnah, and Shulchan Aruch. The word kippurim (atonements) is one of many Biblical Hebrew words.

Beginning in the classical period, the singular form kippur began to be used in piyyut, for example in Unetanneh Tokef, alongside the standard plural form kippurim. Use of kippur spread in the medieval period, with Yom Kippur (יום כיפור) becoming the holiday's name in Yiddish and Kippur (כיפור) in Ladino.

In older English texts, the translation "Day of Atonement" is often used.

== In the Torah ==
The Torah calls the day Yom HaKippurim (יוֹם הַכִּיפּוּרִים), and strictly prohibits work on the tenth day of the seventh month, later known as Tishrei. The laws of Yom Kippur are commanded by God to Moses in three passages in the Torah:

1. Leviticus 16:1–34: Aaron may only enter the sanctuary by performing a complex sacrificial procedure, later known as the Yom Kippur Temple service. This service must be performed yearly on the date of Yom Kippur, while the people are to fast and not work on this date.
2. Leviticus 23:26–32: The tenth day of Tishrei is a holy day of atonement. A Temple sacrifice must be offered, while the people must not work, "on the ninth day from evening until evening".
3. Numbers 29:7–11: The tenth day of Tishrei is a holy day; one must not work. The mussaf (additional) sacrifice for the day is specified.

Yom Kippur is mentioned briefly in another context: on Yom Kippur of the Jubilee year the shofar was to be blown. According to some, this is the source of the current custom of blowing the shofar at the conclusion of Yom Kippur.

=== Temple service ===
When the Temple in Jerusalem stood, Yom Kippur was the occasion of an elaborate sacrificial service, as commanded by Leviticus 16. A prominent portion of the service was the lottery drawn on two goats, with one selected to be sacrificed as an offering and the other sent to Azazel to be thrown off a cliff. This is the origin for the term scapegoat. The rabbis summarized the laws of this service in Mishnah tractate Yoma, and they appear in contemporary traditional Jewish prayer books for Yom Kippur, and are studied as part of a traditional Jewish Yom Kippur worship service. The Mussaf prayer on Yom Kippur includes a section known as the Avodah, where a poem is recited describing the details of this Temple service.

== Significance ==
=== High Holy Days ===
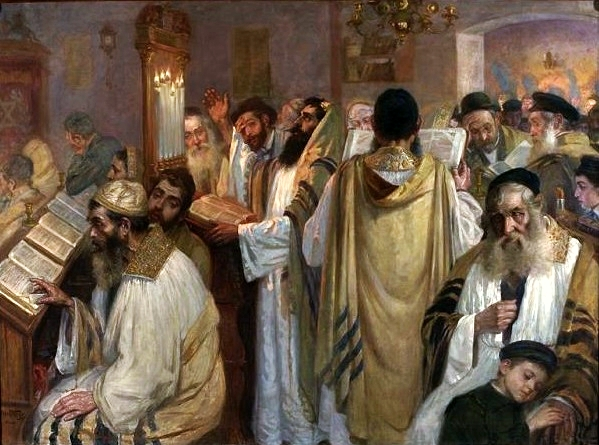
On the eve of Yom Kippur by Jakub Weinles

Yom Kippur is one of the two halves of the High Holy Days, or Days of Awe (Hebrew yamim noraim), alongside Rosh Hashanah (which falls nine days earlier). According to Jewish tradition, God inscribes each person's fate for the coming year into the Book of Life on Rosh Hashanah and "seals" the verdict on Yom Kippur. This process is described dramatically in the poem Unetanneh Tokef, which is recited on Rosh Hashanah in the Ashkenazic and Italian rites and on Yom Kippur in the Eastern Ashkenazic and Italian rites:

A great shofar will be blown, and a small still voice will be heard. The angels will make haste, and be seized with fear and trembling, and will say: "Behold, the day of judgment!"... On Rosh Hashanah it is written, and on the Yom Kippur fast it is sealed, how many will pass and how many will be created, who will live and who will die, who in his time and who not in his time... But repentance [teshuva], prayer, and charity [tzedakah] remove the evil of the decree... For You do not desire a person's death, but rather that he repent and live. Until the day of his death You wait for him; if he repents, You accept him immediately.

During the Days of Awe, a Jew reflects on the past year's actions and seeks forgiveness for wrongs done against both God and other people.

=== Repentance (Teshuva) ===
Repentance in Judaism (Hebrew: Teshuva), traditionally, consists of regretting having committed the sin, resolving not to commit that sin in the future, and confessing that sin before God.

While repentance for one's sins can and should be done at any time, it is considered especially desirable during the Ten Days of Repentance between Rosh Hashanah and Yom Kippur, and particularly on Yom Kippur itself. Thus, the Yom Kippur prayers contain extended confessions which list varieties of errors and sins, and to which one can add their own missteps, along with requests for forgiveness from God.

According to the Talmud, "Yom Kippur atones for sins done against God (bein adam leMakom), but does not atone for sins done against other human beings (bein adam lechavero) until the other person has been appeased." Therefore, it is considered imperative to repair the harm that one has done to others before or during Yom Kippur. Yom Kippur is described in the prayers as "a day of creating love and brotherhood, a day of abandoning jealousy and strife". It is said that "if one does not remove hatred [from their heart] on Yom Kippur, their prayers are not heard".

In recent generations other interpretations of teshuvah have been presented. They argue that the traditional, self-punishing practice of dwelling on and weeping over past sins often leads to depression and is counterproductive in the modern era. Instead of "repentance" (focusing on guilt and remorse over mistakes), they interpret teshuvah in a more literal sense: "return" to God. This involves proactively filling one's life with Torah, Mitzvot, joy, love, and sincere prayer to God. When one is wholeheartedly focused on growing closer to the Divine light, the regrettable behaviors of one's past are naturally recognized as a useless weight holding them back. This recognition triggers a genuine, aching remorse that causes the sin to fall away, enabling the person to let go and continue growing. Thus, Yom Kippur should be used to reach toward the light and embrace God's unconditional love, allowing one's sins to fall away.

=== Thirteen attributes ===
According to the Bible, after the sin of the golden calf, Moses descended from Mount Sinai and broke the Tablets of Stone, which contained the Ten Commandments and symbolized the covenant with God. After God agreed to forgive the people's sin, Moses was told to return to Mount Sinai for a second 40-day period, in order to receive a second set of tablets. According to rabbinic tradition, the date Moses descended with the second set of tablets was Yom Kippur. On this day Moses announced to the people that they had been forgiven; as a result the Torah fixed this date as a permanent holiday of forgiveness.

The new covenant, which God announced by proclaiming the Thirteen Attributes of Mercy to Moses, is textually similar to the covenant of the Ten Commandments except that God's nature is described as merciful and forgiving, rather than zealous. When Jewish people sinned in later eras, prophets would repeatedly quote the Thirteen Attributes to God as a reminder of God's commitment to mercy and forgiveness. This continues to the present day, as recitation of the Thirteen Attributes remains an important part of the Yom Kippur prayers (originally recited in all prayers of the day, but in most Eastern European communities recited today only in Maariv and Ne'ila).

=== Closeness to God ===
While many of the observances of Yom Kippur (such as fasting and long prayers) can be difficult, there is also a tradition in which they are interpreted positively, as indications of closeness of God. Various sources compare the observances of Yom Kippur—fasting, barefootness (not wearing leather shoes), standing (in prayer), particular manners of prayer, even the peace that exists between Jews on this day—to the behavior of angels, suggesting that on Yom Kippur Jews become like angels in heaven, purified and close to God and not limited by physicality.

Yom Kippur was also unique as a time of closeness to God in the Yom Kippur Temple service. It was the only occasion on which the High Priest of Israel was allowed to enter the Holy of Holies, the innermost chamber of the Temple in Jerusalem, where God's presence was said to dwell. On Yom Kippur the High Priest entered the Holy of Holies several times, first to create a cloud of incense smoke in which (the Bible promises) God would reveal Himself without being seen, and later to offer sacrifices of atonement.

While the encounter with God and the atonement may appear unrelated, in fact they are mutually dependent. On one hand, the priest is only worthy to approach God when in a state of purity, with the sins of the people forgiven. On the other hand, only by approaching God with an intimate, personal request can God be persuaded to abandon justice for mercy, permitting the purification to take place.

According to the Torah, the Yom Kippur Temple service was commanded in wake of the deaths of Nadab and Abihu on the eighth day of the Tabernacle inauguration. Not only was this eighth day the occasion of the Yom Kippur command, but the eighth day was also similar in its nature to Yom Kippur, both in biblical texts (e.g. the sacrifices offered on each day) and in rabbinic interpretation. The purpose of the eighth day was the revelation of God's presence to the people; similarly, the Yom Kippur service was a unique opportunity for the people's representative to obtain closeness with God.

A midrash compares the Yom Kippur prayers to a verse from the Song of Songs, describing a woman who rises from bed at night to begin a romantic encounter with her lover. With each Yom Kippur prayer, it is implied, Jews approach closer to God:

"I rose up to open to my beloved. My hands dripped with myrrh, my fingers with flowing myrrh, upon the handles of the bolt" (Song of Songs 5:5) – "I rose up to open to my beloved" – this refers to Yotzer [the morning prayer]; "My hands dripped with myrrh" – this refers to Mussaf; "my fingers with flowing myrrh" – this refers to Mincha; "upon the handles of the bolt" – this refers to Ne'ila.

Using a similar metaphor, the Mishnah describes Yom Kippur as a wedding date, as on this date Moses returned, having reestablished the covenant between God and Israel. Along with Tu B'Av, Yom Kippur was historically considered one of the two happiest days of the Jewish year, for on this day Jews receive forgiveness for their sins the covenant with God is reestablished.

According to Hasidic philosophy Yom Kippur is related to the deepest level of the human soul. The soul is described as having five different levels, the fifth and most essential of which is called Yechidah, meaning "one and unique". This yechidah is the soul in its state of complete fusion and oneness with its Creator, forming an inseparable whole.

Yom Kippur is the day when this essential bond of yechidah shines within the time and space of our world. It is the one time a year when the Divine unites with the essential oneness of the soul within each person, and in that moment of ultimate connection, all else falls away.

=== Purification ===
In Leviticus 16:30, the Torah summarizes the purpose of Yom Kippur as follows:

For on this day atonement shall be made for you, to purify you; from all your sins before the Lord you shall be purified.

There are two forms of impurity in Judaism (see Tumah and taharah): ritual impurity (e.g. when one touches a corpse) and moral impurity (when one commits a serious sin). While the Yom Kippur Temple service did purify the Temple if it had become ritually impure, the emphasis of the day is on the Jewish people's purification from moral impurity.

Leviticus 16:30 mentions purification twice. According to Netziv, the first mention is a promise that God will purify Israel on this day, while the second is a command, calling on Israel to purify themselves through repentance. Thus, on this day Jews do their utmost to repent. But if, by the end of the day, they have reached the limits of their ability and are still morally flawed, God extends them forgiveness and purification anyway.

Jeremiah 17:13 states that "Israel's hope (mikveh) is in God". According to Rabbi Akiva, this verse alludes to a ritual purification bath (also pronounced mikveh), and thus on Yom Kippur God metaphorically becomes a mikveh in which Israel immerses and purifies itself. This idea is symbolized by immersion in an actual mikveh. In the Yom Kippur Temple service, the High Priest would immerse upon putting on and taking off his white Yom Kippur garments; the rabbis counted no fewer than five immersions over the course of the day's service. Among modern-day Jews, too, there is a custom of immersion before Yom Kippur (though not on Yom Kippur itself, as bathing is forbidden in normal circumstances).

When the scapegoat was selected on Yom Kippur to symbolically carry the people's sins to the desert, a crimson cord was tied around its horns. While the practical purpose of this cord was to distinguish the scapegoat from the goat which was to be slaughtered, it also symbolized the sin which the scapegoat was carrying away. Isaiah 1:18 promises that if the Jewish people repents, "if [their] sins are like crimson, they shall become white as snow." According to tradition, in some years the scapegoat's cord would miraculously turn white to indicate that the people's sins were forgiven and purification achieved in that year.

=== Jewish unity ===
Yom Kippur is considered a day of Jewish unity. In Kol Nidre, in which vows are released, vows of excommunication against sinning Jews were similarly lifted and these "transgressors" were allowed to pray alongside other Jews. According to the Talmud, "Any fast in which Jewish sinners do not also participate is not a valid fast".

Similarly, the Mishnah describes Yom Kippur as a day on which men and women met each other in the vineyards to arrange marriages. While this story is surprising given the generally somber nature of the day, it is based on the Biblical episode where the oath against marrying Benjaminites was circumvented by allowing them to take women from the vineyards as wives, and thus indicates the day's theme of abandoning grudges in order for the Jewish people to be reunited.

== Customs ==
=== Erev Yom Kippur ===
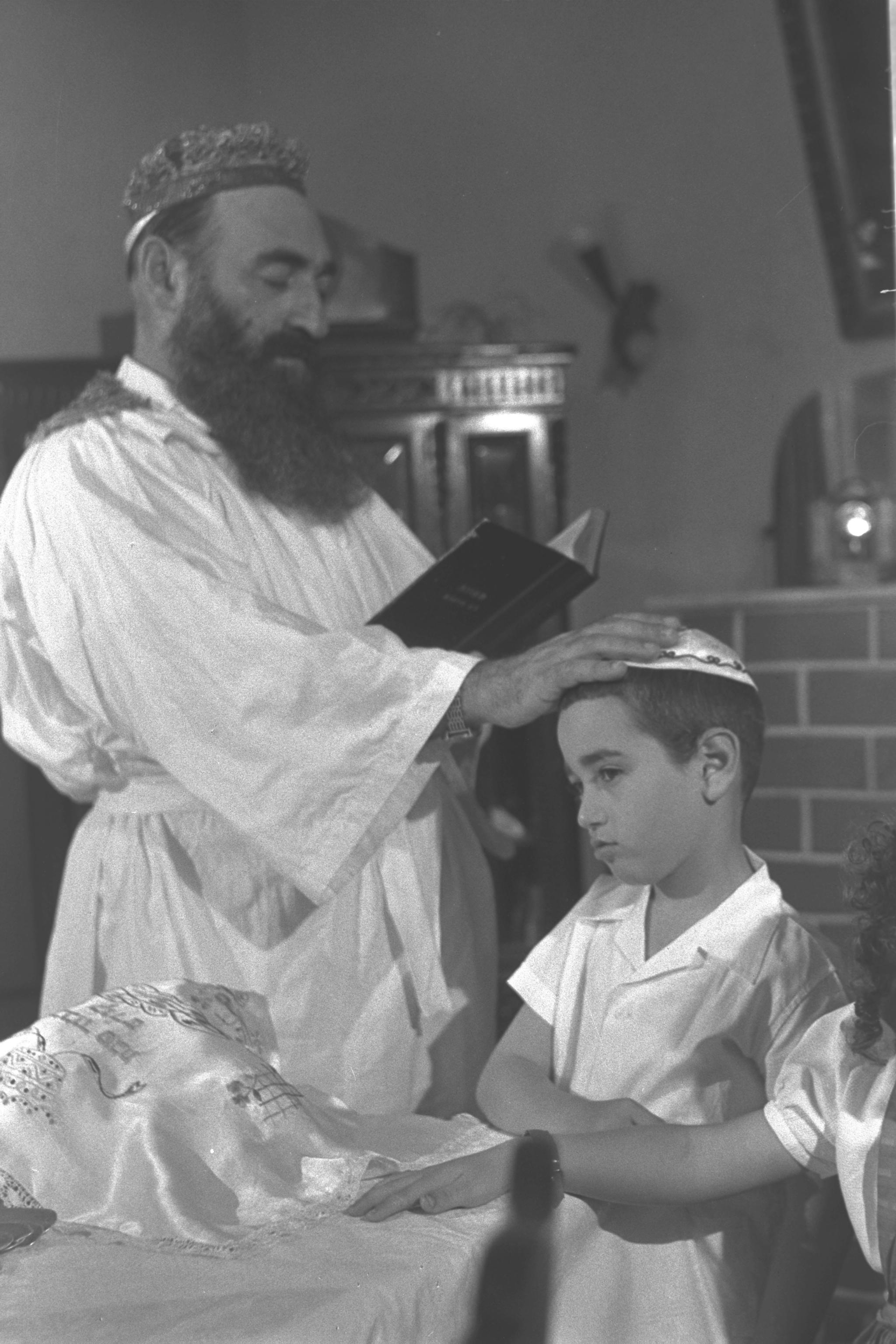
A Jewish man, wearing a kittel, blessing his family on Yom Kippur eve

On the day preceding Yom Kippur, known as Erev Yom Kippur (lit. 'eve [of] day [of] atonement'), several activities are customarily performed that generally relate to the holiday's themes but are forbidden or impractical on Yom Kippur itself.

According to the Talmud, "Yom Kippur does not atone for sins between a person and his fellow until he has appeased his fellow." Thus, it is common practice on Erev Yom Kippur to request people's forgiveness for misdeeds one has done to them. The Talmud records no less than 14 stories attesting to the day's importance for repairing relationships with one's spouses, parents, children, coworkers, the poor, and others. The day before a major Jewish holiday is often devoted to preparing for the holiday (as with burning chametz before Passover or obtaining the Four Species before Sukkot); for Yom Kippur, the appropriate preparation is to seek forgiveness from one's fellow man. Nevertheless, one should not ask forgiveness if this will cause further harm (for example, by bringing up an insult the victim was unaware of).

According to halakha, one must eat on Erev Yom Kippur. Various reasons have been suggested for this, among them:

- Eating well before the fast will make it easier to complete the fast in good health.
- Eating before the fast will actually make the fast subjectively more difficult, due to "withdrawal" from the previous day's feast, and thus increase a person's level of "affliction" on this day (though it is not agreed that a person should in fact attempt to increase their affliction beyond the basic requirements).
- In general, Jewish holidays are celebrated with festive meals. Since a meal celebrating Yom Kippur cannot be held on the day itself, it is held beforehand.
- One celebrates the forgiveness they are about to receive for their sins, thus demonstrating that they are in fact bothered by their sins, and thus are more deserving of forgiveness.

Kreplach are traditionally served at the pre-fast meal. Also, it is common to ask for and receive lekach on Erev Yom Kippur.

Many Orthodox men immerse themselves in a mikveh on this day. Opinions differ on whether this is a to remove ritual impurity or to symbolize one's cleansing from sin.

The kapparot ritual, in which either money or a chicken is given to charity, is performed by some on Erev Yom Kippur as a means to enhance atonement.

Before the morning prayer service (Shacharit), selichot prayers are recited, as they have been for the entire High Holiday period. In the afternoon prayer (Mincha), the long confession is recited, just as it is on Yom Kippur itself. This confession is recited before the last Erev Yom Kippur meal (the "Separation Meal" – Hebrew se'udah hamafseket or aruha hamafseket), in case one becomes intoxicated at this meal and is unable to confess properly afterward, or because one might choke to death at that meal and die without confessing (a seemingly unlikely possibility, but one that reminds a person of their mortality). Nevertheless, some recommend repeating the Vidui immediately before Kol Nidrei if time allows.

=== Fasting and asceticism ===
The Torah commands Jews to "afflict themselves" (ve'initem et nafshoteichem) on Yom Kippur. While these verses do not explicitly mention the form of affliction, the phrase "afflicting oneself" frequently appears elsewhere in connection with fasting or lack of food, and public fast days for repentance were a common practice in Biblical times. According to the Jewish oral tradition, the Yom Kippur "affliction" consists of the following five prohibitions:

1. Fasting (no eating and drinking)
2. No wearing of leather shoes
3. No bathing or washing
4. No anointing oneself with perfumes or lotions
5. No marital relations.

The fast is traditionally required of males over age 13 and females over 12. Fasting is waived in the case of dangerous medical conditions (pikuach nefesh), and in such cases one is actually required to break the fast. Just as it is a mitzvah to fast on Yom Kippur, it may be a mitzvah to eat or drink to safeguard one's health. In such situations, though, it is preferable (if the medical situation allows for it) to consume only small amounts of food or drink at a time.

Fasting, along with the other restrictions, begins at sunset and ends after dusk the next day. One should add a few minutes to the beginning and end of the day, called tosefet Yom Kippur, lit. 'addition to Yom Kippur'.

Yom Kippur is one of the only occasions when fasting is permitted on Shabbat.

==== Symbolism ====
A number of different interpretations of these restrictions have been suggested.

In one approach, fasting replaces animal sacrifices. Fasting causes one's fat and blood to be diminished, just as the fat and blood of a sacrifice were burned on the altar. Thus, the fast is a form of sacrifice which can atone for sin like the Temple sacrifices once did.

Other approaches suggest that the prohibitions represent not suffering, but rather special holiness. For example, on Yom Kippur, Jews are said to become like angels. Just as angels do not need to eat, drink, or wear shoes, so too Jews do not engage on these activities on Yom Kippur. By detaching themselves from physical needs, Jews become purified and resemble angels.

Similarly, the prohibitions allude to the experience of Moses on Mount Sinai, who did not eat or drink while receiving the Torah and while receiving forgiveness for the people's sins.

Similarly, the prohibitions have been interpreted as a return to the purity of the biblical Garden of Eden. Upon leaving Eden shoes became necessary for the first time ("thorns and thistles will grow in your way...the snake will raise its head (to bite you) and you will give your heel (to crush it)"); thus on Yom Kippur, Jews do not wear (leather) shoes. While in Eden food and drink were easily obtained, but after the expulsion man must work for food "by the sweat of [his] brow"; thus food and drink are refrained from on Yom Kippur, as well as washing, and the use of cosmetics to remove sweat or its odor. In Eden death was unknown and procreation unnecessary; similarly on Yom Kippur marital relations are avoided.

According to Maimonides, the purpose of fasting (and the restriction on work) is to remove distractions from the task of repentance.

By refraining from these activities, the body is uncomfortable but can still survive. The soul is considered to be the life force in a body. Therefore, by making one's body uncomfortable, one's soul is uncomfortable. By feeling pain, one can feel how others feel when they are in pain.

=== Prohibition on work ===
The Torah calls Yom Kippur a day of rest (shabbat shabbaton) on which work is prohibited. Thus, the activities forbidden on Shabbat are also forbidden on Yom Kippur: the 39 categories of work as well as the rabbinic Shabbat prohibitions.

=== Other observances ===
Yom Kippur prayers, Tel Aviv, 2025

Wearing white clothing is traditional to symbolize one's purity on this day. Various reasons have been suggested for this custom:

- On Yom Kippur, Jews are similar to the angels in heaven who are said to wear white.
- To allude to the verse "If your sins are like crimson, they shall become white as snow" (Isaiah 1:18)
- To recall the High Priest who wore white for the Yom Kippur Temple service (and on no other occasion)

Many Ashkenazi Jewish men wear a kittel which, in addition to being white, symbolizes the seriousness of God's judgment on this day, as in some communities the deceased are buried wearing kittels.

Yom Kippur is honored in the same ways as Shabbat and other holidays, to the extent permitted. Thus, the house is cleaned ahead of time, and the table covered with a nice tablecloth, even though it will not be used for eating. The synagogue is cleaned ahead of time, and all the lights left on. One bathes before Yom Kippur, and clean clothes are worn. Smelling pleasant smells is allowed on Yom Kippur, therefore many make a point of smelling pleasant spices throughout the day.

In most communities, candles are lit just before Yom Kippur, as is done before Shabbat. However, there were communities which had the custom not to light candles when Yom Kippur falls on a weekday (when it falls on Shabbat, everyone agrees that there is an obligation to light just like any other Sabbath), and therefore the Halakhic authorities debate whether or not a blessing is recited on this lighting.

It is traditional for parents to give their children a special blessing before beginning the Yom Kippur prayers. Those whose parents have died light a yahrzeit candle in their memory before Yom Kippur begins.

=== Breaking of the fast ===
Following the fast, Sephardic Jewish communities traditionally serve a drink made from melon seeds similar to the Turkish sübye. Turkish Jews refer to it as subiye, while Greek Jews call it pepitada. This is followed by coffee with milk and biscochos (savory ring-shaped cookies), pieces of bread dipped in olive oil and za'atar alongside tomato, and later, chicken cooked with dry quinces or plums.

== Prayer services ==
"Kol Nidrei", opening the Yom Kippur prayers, recorded in the early 1950s

The Yom Kippur prayer service includes several unique aspects. One is the number of prayer services. Unlike a regular day which has three prayer services (Shacharit, Mincha, and Maariv), or a Shabbat or Yom Tov which has four prayer services (those three, plus Mussaf), Yom Kippur has five prayer services (those four, plus Ne'ila, the closing prayer). The prayer services also include private and public confessions of sins (Vidui), and a unique prayer dedicated to the special Yom Kippur avodah (service) of the Kohen Gadol (high priest) in the Holy Temple in Jerusalem. The Yom Kippur prayer services include additional poems (piyyutim) and petitions for forgiveness (selichot). Notable poems recited include Avinu Malkeinu, Unetanneh Tokef (in Eastern Ashkenazic and Italian communities), Ki Anu Amecha (in Ashkenazic communities, although the order of the verses varies between communities), the Ten Martyrs (in Eastern Ashkenazic and some Western Ashkenazic communities), HaAderet v'HaEmunah, and Mareh Kohen (both in Ashkenazic communities). If Yom Kippur falls on Shabbat, Avinu Malkeinu is recited by Ashkenazic only during the Ne'ila prayer service, whereas the Sephardic and Italian rite recite it as normal at Shacharit and Mincha.

Many married Ashkenazi Orthodox men wear a kittel, a white robe-like garment for evening prayers on Yom Kippur, also used in Eastern European communities by men on their wedding day. They also wear a tallit (prayer shawl), which is typically worn only during morning services.

=== Order of prayers ===
Print that commemorates the Yom Kippur service of Jewish soldiers in the German Army during the siege of the Fortress of Metz, 1870.

Before the beginning of Yom Kippur, many Jews recite the optional Tefillah Zakkah ('the pure prayer'), in which (among other topics) one declares that they forgive anyone who has harmed them in the past, "except for damages which can be recovered in court, and except for those who say: I will harm him and he will forgive me", asks God not to punish anyone who has been so forgiven, and asks God to show similar graciousness in forgiving their own sins.

Like all Jewish holidays, Yom Kippur begins in the evening, and the evening prayer (Maariv) is preceded by the special Kol Nidre (described below) prayer.

The next morning, the morning prayer (Shacharit) is recited. The Torah reading is from Leviticus 16, describing the Yom Kippur Temple service and the laws of the day. The Yom Kippur Torah reading is divided into six portions, and seven on the Sabbath. The Haftarah is from Isaiah 57:14–58:14, according to which God will ignore the prayers of one who fasts while continuing to perform evil deeds. In most communities, Yizkor is then recited.

Next is the added prayer (Mussaf) as on all other holidays. The highlight of this prayer is the Avodah recitation, where the prayer leader recounts the Yom Kippur Temple service by which the High Priest would once obtain atonement from God in the Temple in Jerusalem. Other notable additions to the Mussaf service on Yom Kippur in the Eastern Ashkenazic rite include the Unetanneh Tokef and Ten Martyrs poems.

While the common custom was for the Yom Kippur prayer service to take the entire day with no break, in recent years some have instituted a short break after Mussaf before the Mincha and Ne'ila prayers, which last until the conclusion of the fast.

Next is the afternoon prayer (Mincha) and a Torah reading. The Haftarah that follows is the entire Book of Jonah, which has as its theme the story of God's willingness to forgive those who repent.

The service concludes with the Ne'ila ("closing") prayer, which begins shortly before sunset, when the "gates of prayer" will be closed. After Ne'ila, Yom Kippur comes to an end with a recitation of Shema Yisrael and the blowing of the shofar, which marks the conclusion of the fast and symbolizes freedom from sin. The phrase "L'Shana Haba'ah" (meaning "Next Year in Jerusalem") is traditionally recited at the conclusion of Ne'ila. The passage first appears as part of the liturgy for Yom Kippur in the Machzor Vitry, published in the 12th-13th centuries. Rabbi Jonathan Sacks, who served as Chief Rabbi of the United Hebrew Congregations of the Commonwealth from 1991 to 2013, cited the recitation of the song at the conclusion of both the Passover and Yom Kippur liturgy as a sign of the enduring Jewish connection to Jerusalem.

Finally, the regular weekday Maariv prayer is recited, before the recitation of Havdalah.

=== Kol Nidre ===
Before sunset on Yom Kippur eve, worshipers gather in the synagogue. The cantor stands with two community members at his sides, and chants the Kol Nidre prayer (Aramaic: כל נדרי, English translation: 'All vows'). It is recited in a dramatic manner, before the open ark, with an Ashkenazic melody that dates back to the 16th century. Kol Nidre is recited in Aramaic, except in the Italian and Romaniote rites where it is recited in Hebrew.

All personal vows we are likely to make, all personal oaths and pledges we are likely to take between this Yom Kippur and the next Yom Kippur (in some versions: which we took between last Yom Kippur and this Yom Kippur), we publicly renounce. Let them all be relinquished and abandoned, null and void, neither firm nor established. Let our personal vows, pledges and oaths be considered neither vows nor pledges nor oaths.

Then the service continues with the evening prayers (Maariv) and an extended Selichot service.

=== Avodah ===
The Avodah ('service') passage in the Musaf prayer recounts in detail the Yom Kippur Temple service which was once performed in the Temple in Jerusalem. This passage traditionally features prominently in both the liturgy and the religious thought of the holiday. During its recitation, Jews "imagine themselves in place of the priests when the Temple stood".

This traditional prominence is rooted in the Babylonian Talmud's description of how to attain atonement following the destruction of the Temple in tractate Yoma. The recitation poetically describes the High Priest's confessions of his and the people's sins, his entry into the Holy of Holies, his sending away of the scapegoat, and all other parts of this day's complex Temple service. A variety of liturgical poems are added, including a poem recounting the radiance of the High Priest after exiting the Holy of Holies, as well as prayers for the speedy rebuilding of the Temple and the restoration of sacrificial worship.

In most Orthodox and some Conservative synagogues, the entire congregation prostrates themselves at each point in the recitation where the High Priest would pronounce God's holiest name (during recitation of Leviticus 16:30). These three times, plus in some congregations the Aleinu prayer during the Musaf Amidah on Yom Kippur and Rosh Hashanah, are the only times in Jewish services when Jews engage in prostration (except for some Yemenite Jews and talmidei haRambam ('disciples of Maimonides') who may prostrate themselves on other occasions during the year).

Orthodox liturgies include prayers lamenting the inability to perform the Temple service and petitioning for its restoration, which Conservative synagogues generally omit. In some Conservative synagogues, only the Hazzan (cantor) engages in full prostration. Some Conservative synagogues abridge the recitation of the Avodah service to varying degrees, and some omit it entirely. Reconstructionist services omit the entire service as inconsistent with modern sensibilities.

=== Confession ===
A woman hitting her chest while saying Vidui (confession) during Yom Kippur prayers

As confession is a core aspect of repentance, confession (or vidui) is a major part of the Yom Kippur prayer services. A confession is recited ten times on Yom Kippur, twice in each of the five standard prayers. In each prayer service, the confession is recited once by the individual in their Amidah (silent prayer) and again communally during the cantor's repetition of the Amidah. (The Maariv prayer has no repetition, so the second confession is instead recited in the communal Selichot recitation which follows the silent prayer.) Confession is recited an 11th time by individuals in the Mincha prayer of Yom Kippur eve, before the beginning of the holiday, and in some communities this is repeated by the Chazzan.

The Yom Kippur confession text consists of two parts: a short confession beginning with the word Ashamnu (אשמנו, 'we have sinned'), which is a series of words describing sin arranged according to the aleph-bet (Hebrew alphabetic order), and a long confession, beginning with the words Al Cheyt (על חטא, 'for the sin'), which is a set of 22 acrostics, in some communities double acrostics, also arranged according to the aleph-bet, enumerating a range of sins. Al Cheyt is omitted in both recitations of the confession in Ne'ila.

=== In Reform Judaism ===
Reform synagogues generally experience their largest attendance of the year on Yom Kippur and Rosh Hashanah for worship services. The prayer philosophy of Reform, as described in the introduction of the movement's High Holy Day prayerbook, Mishkan Hanefesh, is to reflect "varied theological approaches that enable a diverse congregation to share religious experience... with a commitment to Reform tradition, as well as [to] the larger Jewish tradition." A central feature of these Reform services is the rabbinic sermon. "For more than a century and a half in the Reform Movement," writes Rabbi Lance J. Sussman, "High Holiday sermons were among the most anticipated events in synagogue life, especially on the eve of Rosh Hashanah and Kol Nidre night."

== Observance ==
As one of the most culturally significant Jewish holidays, Yom Kippur is observed by many secular Jews who may not observe other holidays. Many secular Jews attend synagogue on Yom Kippur – for many secular Jews the High Holy Days are the only times of the year during which they attend synagogue – causing synagogue attendance to soar.

=== Observance in Israel ===
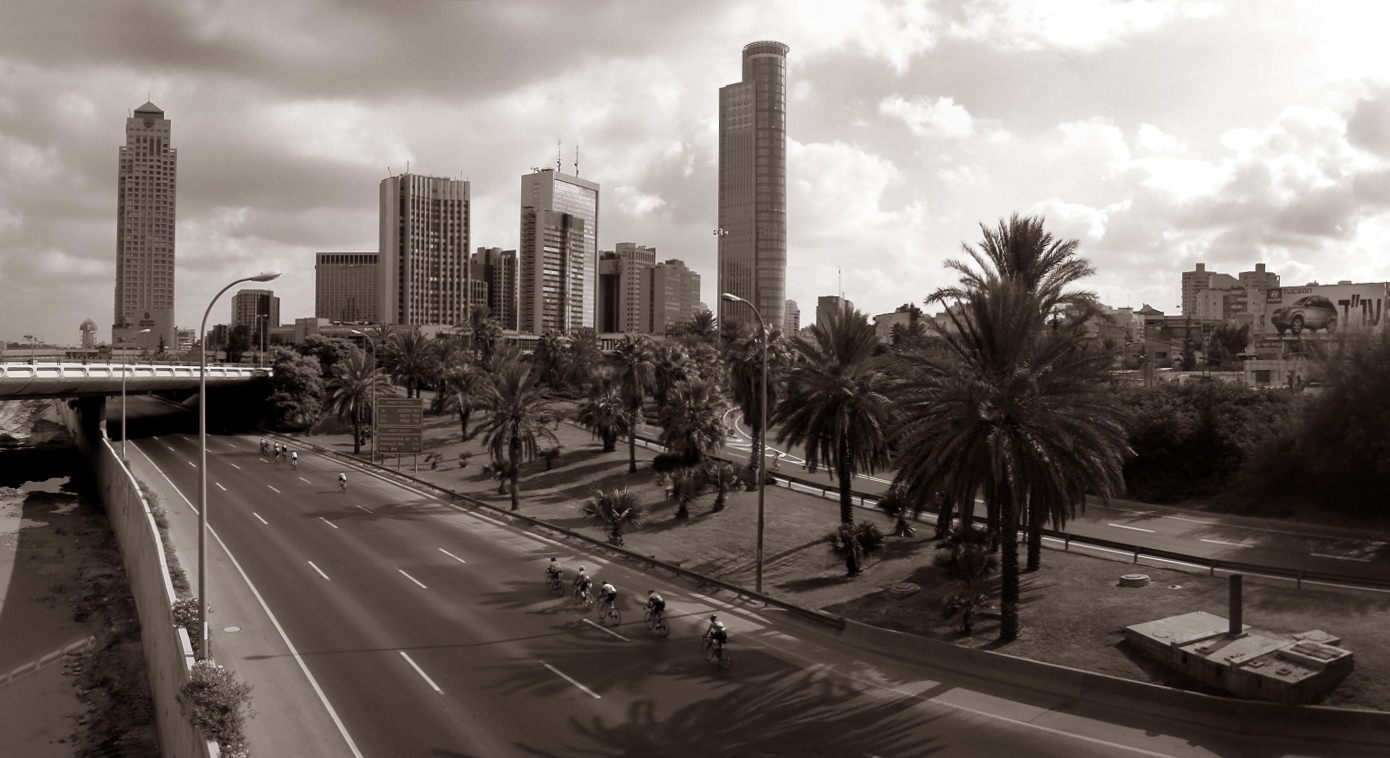
Ayalon Highway in Tel Aviv, empty of cars on Yom Kippur 2004

Yom Kippur is a legal holiday in Israel. There are no radio or television broadcasts, airports are shut down, there is no public transportation, and shops and businesses are closed.

In 2019, 60.5% of the Jewish people of Israel said that they were intending to fast on Yom Kippur. It is very common in Israel to wish Tsom Kal ([an] easy fast) or Tsom Mo'il ([a] benefiting fast) to everyone before Yom Kippur, even if one does not know whether they will fast or not.

It is considered impolite to eat in public on Yom Kippur or to play music or to drive a motor vehicle. There is no legal prohibition on any of these, but in practice such actions are almost universally avoided in Israel during Yom Kippur, except for emergency services.

Over the last few decades, bicycle-riding and inline skating on the empty streets have become common among secular Israeli youths, especially on Yom Kippur in Tel Aviv.

In 1973, an air raid siren was sounded on the afternoon of Yom Kippur and radio broadcasts were resumed to alert the public to the surprise attack on Israel by Egypt and Syria that launched the Yom Kippur War.

=== Observance by athletes ===
Since the early 20th century, numerous Jewish athletes have opted not to participate in their sport on Yom Kippur if a sporting event coincides with the High Holy Day. Such incidents throw into sharp highlight the conflict many Jewish people face between social pressures and personal beliefs on a daily basis. Athletes observing Yom Kippur are often lauded for their decision not to play, which is also seen as a source of pride by many in the Jewish community.

The most famous example of this phenomenon is Hall of Fame pitcher Sandy Koufax of Major League Baseball's Los Angeles Dodgers, who refused to play on Yom Kippur when it clashed with Game 1 of the 1965 World Series which Koufax, the team's best pitcher, was slated to start. Koufax garnered national attention for his decision, which was seen as an example of the conflict between social pressures and personal beliefs.

Similarly, another Baseball Hall of Famer, first baseman Hank Greenberg, garnered national attention in 1934 when he refused to play on Yom Kippur, even though his Detroit Tigers were in the middle of a pennant race and Greenberg himself was leading the league in runs batted in. When Greenberg arrived in synagogue on Yom Kippur, the service stopped suddenly, and the congregation gave an embarrassed Greenberg a standing ovation.

The examples of Greenberg and Koufax have been followed by numerous athletes, including fellow baseball players Shawn Green, Kevin Youkilis, Brad Ausmus, and Art Shamsky. Outside of baseball, notable players to sit out Yom Kippur include: football player Gabe Carimi, golfer Laetitia Beck, chess player Boris Gelfand, and professional wrestler Bill Goldberg.

=== Recognition by the United Nations ===
Since 2016 the United Nations has officially recognized Yom Kippur, stating that from then on no official meetings would take place on the day. In addition, the United Nations stated that, beginning in 2016, they would have nine official holidays and seven floating holidays of which each employee would be able to choose one. It stated that the floating holidays will be Yom Kippur, Day of Vesak, Diwali, Gurpurab, Orthodox Christmas, Orthodox Good Friday, and Presidents' Day. This was the first time the United Nations officially recognized any Jewish holiday.

== Date of Yom Kippur ==
Yom Kippur falls each year on the tenth day of the Jewish month of Tishrei, which is nine days after the first day of Rosh Hashanah. The holiday can only fall on Monday, Tuesday, Thursday or Saturday.

In terms of the Gregorian calendar, the earliest date on which Yom Kippur can fall is 14 September, as happened most recently in 1899 and 2013, and will next occur in 2089. The latest Yom Kippur can occur relative to the Gregorian dates is on 14 October, as happened in 1967 and will happen again in 2043. After 2089, the differences between the Hebrew calendar and the Gregorian calendar will result in Yom Kippur falling no earlier than 15 September. Gregorian calendar dates for recent and upcoming Yom Kippur holidays are:

- Sunset, 11 October 2024 – nightfall, 12 October 2024
- Sunset, 1 October 2025 – nightfall, 2 October 2025
- Sunset, 20 September 2026 – nightfall, 21 September 2026
- Sunset, 10 October 2027 – nightfall, 11 October 2027
- Sunset, 29 September 2028 – nightfall, 30 September 2028

== See also ==
- Ashura – Tenth day of the Islamic month of Muharram
- Break fast – First meal eaten after a fast
- Good Friday – Christian holiday
- Lent – Christian observance before Easter
- Ramadan – Ninth month of the Islamic calendar and month-long fasting event in Islam
