= Yadah =

Yadah is the third person singular qal form of the Hebrew language verbal root ydh. Depending on its conjugation, it carries a range of meanings involving throwing or praising.

- In the qal form, it describes the 'shooting' of arrows in Jeremiah 50:14.
- The piel form means 'throwing' (as in throwing stones at a person, in Lamentations 3:53) or 'casting down' ("the horns of the nations," in Zechariah 2:4).
- In the hiphil form, it normally means 'praising' (usually in the context of ritual worship) and occasionally for confessing one's sins.
- The hitpael form, vidui, has a similar range of meanings, but the word most often means 'confession' and less commonly 'praise'.
