= Yom Kippur Temple service =

Ceremony performed in Jerusalem by the High Priest of Israel

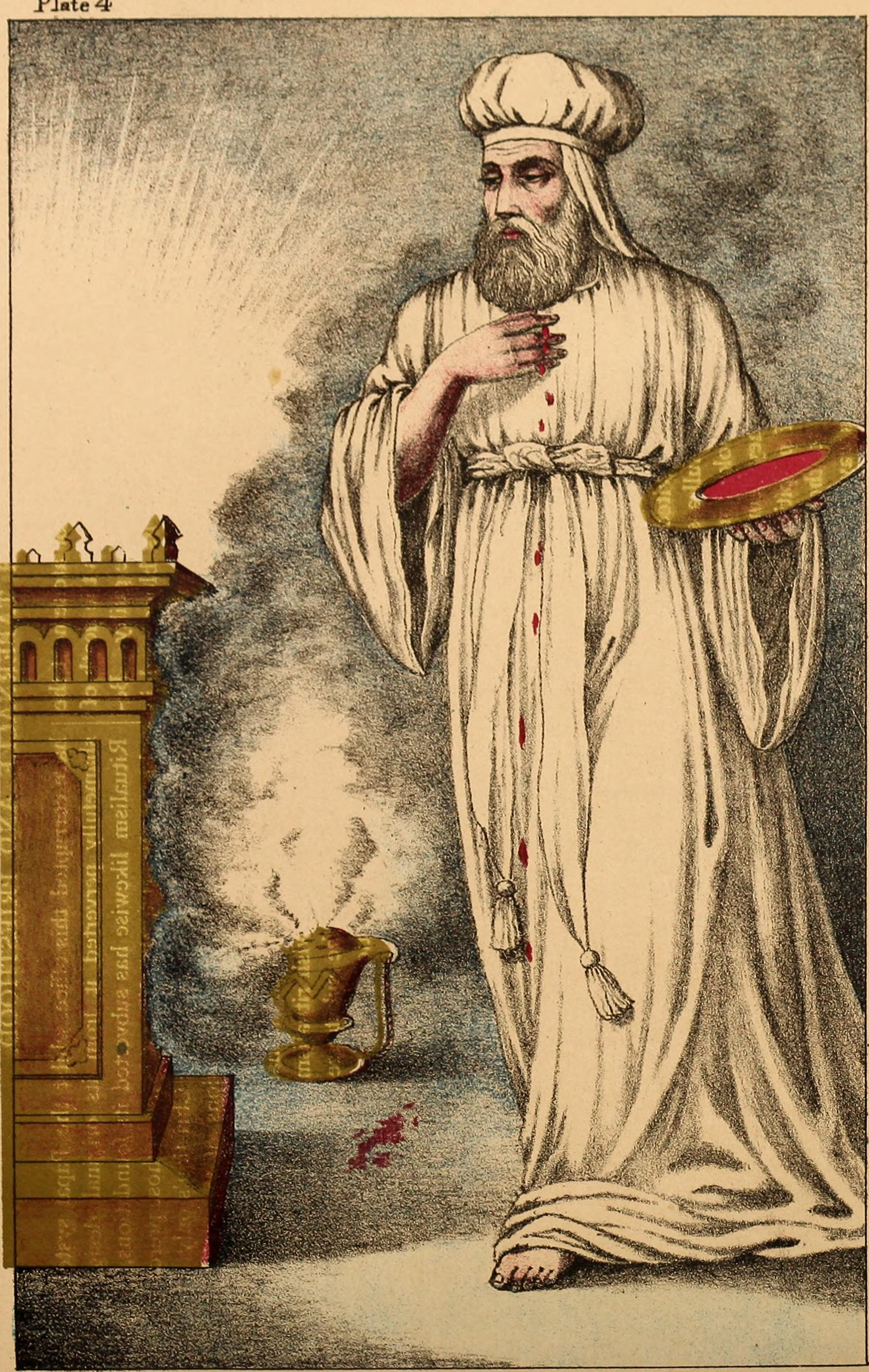
The High Priest in white garments during the sprinkling of the blood on the Golden Altar

In Judaism, the Yom Kippur Temple service was a special sacrificial service performed by the High Priest of Israel on the holiday of Yom Kippur, in the Temple in Jerusalem (and previously in the Tabernacle). Through this service, according to the Bible, the Jewish people would achieve atonement for their sins once each year. The service is notable as the only time in the year any person was allowed to enter the Holy of Holies, and is the source of the term scapegoat.

The service is commanded in Leviticus 16, and its laws are discussed in the Mishnah and Talmud in tractate Yoma.

== Overview ==
While the Temple in Jerusalem was standing (from Biblical times through 70 CE), the Kohen Gadol (High Priest) was mandated by the Torah to perform a complex set of special services and sacrifices for Yom Kippur to attain Divine atonement, the word "kippur" meaning "atonement" in Hebrew.

The Biblical passage suggests three purposes for the service:

- "Thus shall Aaron approach the holy" – the service is a prerequisite for the closest encounter between the High Priest and God
- "He shall make atonement for the most holy place, ... and for the tent of meeting and for the altar" – the purity of the Temple is restored after having been contaminated by the Jewish people's sins
- "For the priests and for the entire people he shall atone" – the people themselves receive forgiveness for their sins

While these purposes superficially appear to be unrelated, in fact none of them can be fulfilled without the others. On one hand, one is only worthy to approach God when in a state of purity, with the sins and impurity of the people and the Temple being removed. On the other hand, only by approaching God with an intimate, personal request can God be persuaded to abandon justice for mercy, permitting the purification to take place.

=== Structure ===
On Yom Kippur in the Temple, three different kinds of service were conducted:

- Daily sacrifice (Tamid): this sacrifice was offered, unchanged, on every day of the year (Numbers 28:3–8)
- Holiday Mussaf sacrifice: each holiday had its own sacrifice (Numbers 29:7–11)
- The special Yom Kippur service, described as the "atonement sin-offering" (hatat hakippurim) (Leviticus 16)

The Yom Kippur atonement offering, specifically, consisted of the following animals:

- From the high priest: one young bull for a sin-offering, and one ram for a burnt-offering
- From the people of Israel: two goats for a sin-offering, and one ram for a burnt-offering

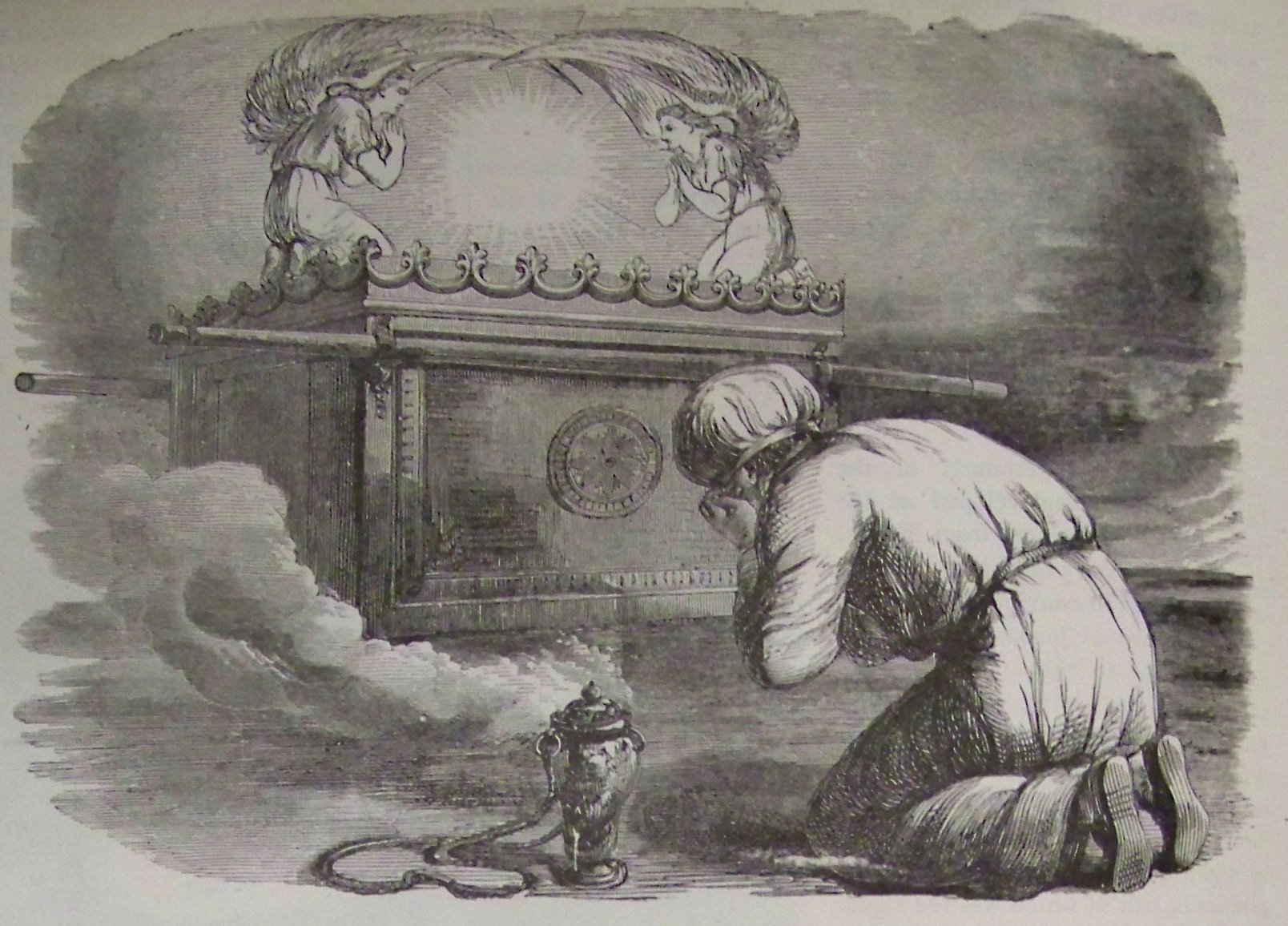
The High Priest offering incense in the Holy of Holies and praying before the Mercy Seat. Illustration from a Bible, 1890

Regarding the people's two goats: lots were chosen, and one became a sacrifice, while the other became the scapegoat.

This service was the only time in the year when the Kohen Gadol was allowed to enter the Holy of Holies in the Temple. On this occasion, the High Priest would enter the Holy of Holies several times, first to offer incense, then to offer blood from the two atonement sin-offerings (his bull and the people's goat). Finally, the High Priest would place his hands on the head of the scapegoat, confess all the people's sins on it, and entrust it to messengers who would lead the goat "to the desert, to Azazel".

The service described so far was performed by the High Priest in special white "linen garments" (bigdei ha-bad) which were worn only for this service. The High Priest performed all sacrifices offered on Yom Kippur (unlike other days when any priest could perform them), but all other sacrifices – the Tamid and Mussaf sacrifices, as well as the rams of the atonement offering – were performed while wearing the High Priest's normal "golden" garments. The white garments have been interpreted as simple garments symbolizing humility, or alternatively as alluding to the white garments worn by angels.

== Procedure ==
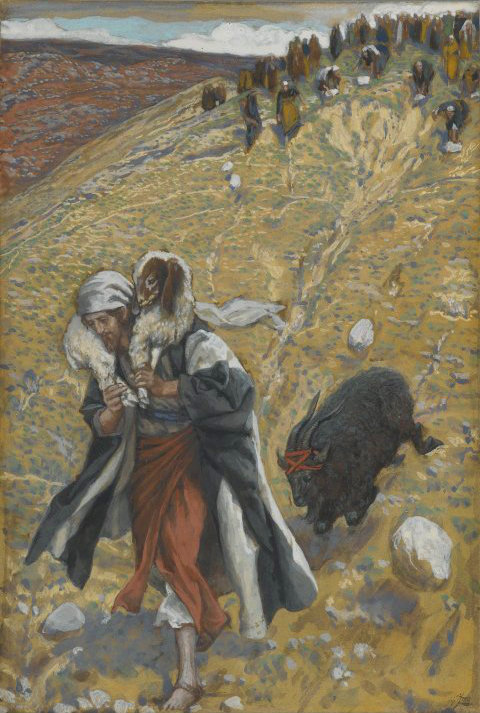
The Scapegoat. Painted by James Tissot

Seven days prior to Yom Kippur, the Kohen Gadol was sequestered in the Palhedrin chamber in the Temple, where he reviewed (studied) the service with the sages familiar with the Temple, and was sprinkled with spring water containing ashes of the Red Heifer as purification.

On the day of Yom Kippur, the Kohen Gadol had to follow a precise order of services, sacrifices, and purifications:

- Morning (Tamid) offering: The Kohen Gadol first performed the regular daily (Tamid) offering in the golden garments, after immersing in a mikveh and washing his hands and feet.
- Garment change 1: The Kohen Gadol immersed in a special mikveh in the Temple courtyard and changed into special linen garments, and washed his hands and feet twice, once after removing the golden garments and once before putting on the linen garments.
- Bull as personal sin-offering: The Kohen Gadol rested his hands and made a confession over the bull on behalf of himself and his household, pronouncing the Tetragrammaton. The people prostrated themselves when they heard.
- Lottery of the goats: At the Eastern (Nikanor) gate, the Kohen Gadol drew lots from a lottery box over two goats. One was selected "for the Lord", and one "for Azazel". The Kohen Gadol tied a red band around the horns of the goat "for Azazel".
- He again confessed over the bull, this time on behalf of all the Kohanim (priests). He then slaughtered his bull as a chatat (sin-offering) and received its blood in a bowl.
- Incense preparation: The Kohen Gadol ascended the mizbeach (altar) and took a shovel full of embers with a special shovel. He was brought incense. He filled his hands and placed it in a vessel. (The Talmud considered this the most physically difficult part of the service, as the Kohen Gadol had to keep the shovelful of glowing coals balanced and prevent its contents from dropping, using his armpit or teeth, while filling his hands with the incense.)
- Incense offering: Holding the shovel and the vessel, he entered the Holy of Holies. In the days of the First Temple, he placed the shovel between the poles of the Ark of the Covenant. In the days of the Second Temple, he put the shovel where the Ark would have been. He waited until the chamber filled with smoke, recited a short prayer, and left.
- Sprinkling of bull's blood in the Holy of Holies: The Kohen Gadol took the bowl with the bull's blood and entered the Holy of Holies again. He sprinkled the bull's blood with his finger eight times, before the Ark in the days of the First Temple, where it would have been in the days of the Second. The Kohen Gadol then left the Holy of Holies, putting the bowl on a stand in front of the Parochet (curtain separating the Holy from the Holy of Holies).
- Goat "for the Lord" as a sin-offering: The Kohen Gadol went to the eastern end of the Israelite courtyard near the Nikanor Gate, and slaughtered the goat.
- Sprinkling of goat's blood in the Holy of Holies: The Kohen Gadol took the bowl with the goat's blood and entered the Holy of Holies again. He sprinkled the goat's blood the same manner he had sprinkled the bull's blood, and left the bowl of goat's blood outside the curtain.
- Sprinkling of blood in the Holy: Standing in the Holy (on the other side of the curtain from the Holy of Holies), the Kohen Gadol took the bull's blood from the stand and sprinkled it with his finger eight times in the direction of the Parochet. He then did the same with the goat's blood.
- Smearing of blood on the Golden (Incense) Altar: The Kohen Gadol removed the goat's blood from the stand and mixed it with the bull's blood. Starting at the northeast corner, he then smeared the mixture of blood on each of the four corners of the Golden (Incense) altar in the Holy. He then sprinkled the blood eight times on the altar.

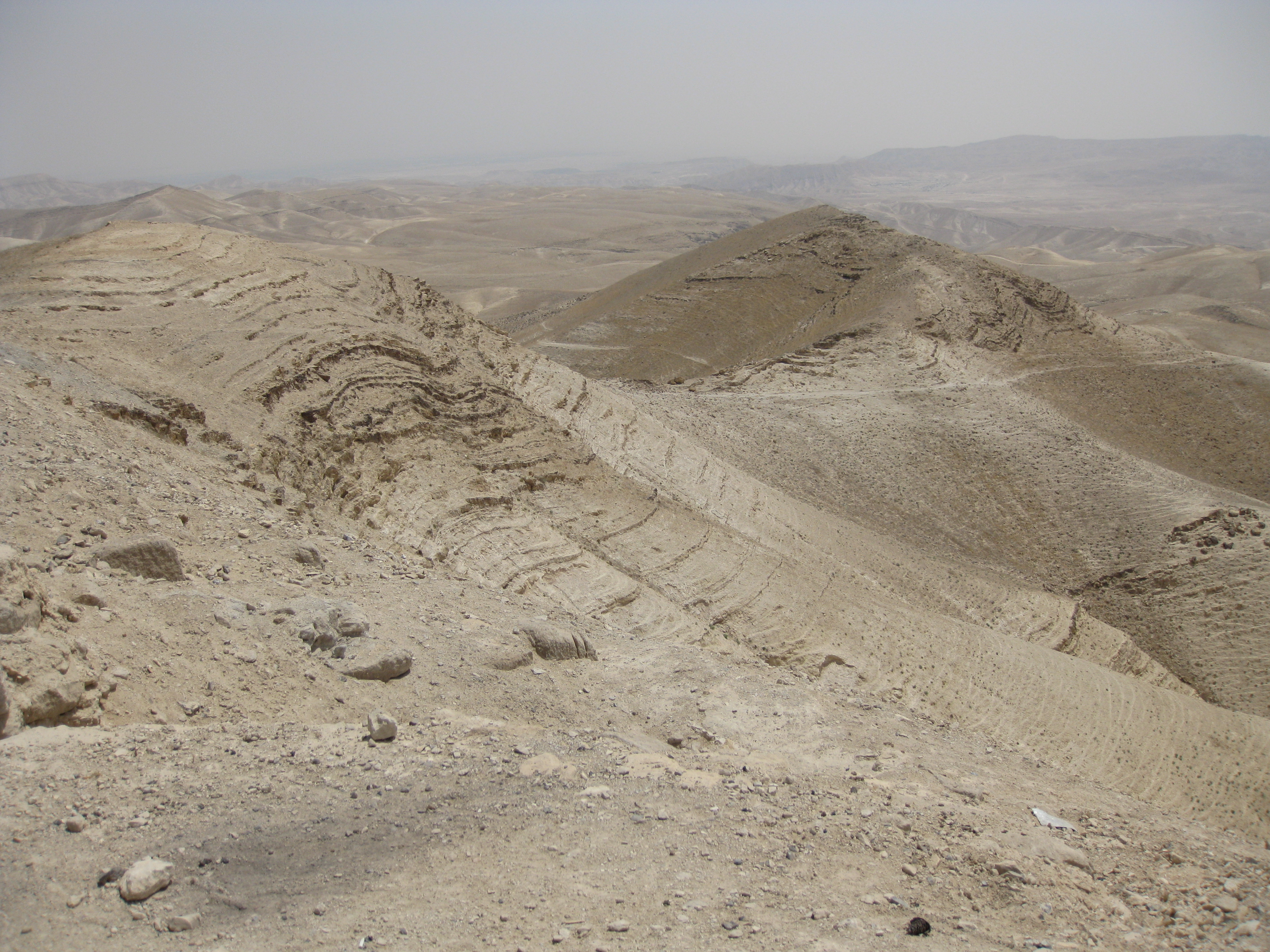
Cliffs of Mount Azazel

- Goat for Azazel: The Kohen Gadol left the Holy and walked to the east side of the Azarah (Israelite courtyard). Near the Nikanor Gate, he rested his hands on the goat "for Azazel" and confessed the sins of the entire people of Israel. While he made a general confession, individuals in the crowd at the Temple would confess privately. The Kohen Gadol then sent the goat off "to the wilderness". In practice, to prevent its return to human habitation, the goat was led to a cliff outside Jerusalem and pushed off its edge.
- Preparation of sacrificial animals: While the goat "for Azazel" was being led to the cliff, the Kohen Gadol removed the insides of the bull and intertwined the bodies of the bull and goat. Other people took the bodies to the Beit HaDeshen (place of the ashes). They were burned there after it was confirmed that the goat "for Azazel" had reached the wilderness.
- Burning of innards: The Kohen Gadol placed the insides of the bull and goat on the outer altar and burned them entirely.
- Reading the Torah: The Kohen Gadol passed through the Nikanor Gate into the Ezrat Nashim (Women's Courtyard) and read sections of the Torah describing Yom Kippur and its sacrifices.
- Garment change 2: The Kohen Gadol removed his linen garments, immersed in the mikveh in the Temple courtyard, and changed into a second set of golden garments. He washed his hands and feet both before removing the linen garments and after putting on the golden ones.
- Offering of rams: The Kohen Gadol offered two rams as an olah offering.
- Musaf offering: The Kohen Gadol then offered the Musaf offering, though the Mishnah records different opinions about the timing of this offering.
- Garment change 3: The Kohen Gadol removed his golden garments, immersed in the mikveh, and changed to a new set of linen garments, again washing his hands and feet twice.
- Removal of incense from the Holy of Holies: The Kohen Gadol returned to the Holy of Holies and removed the bowl of incense and the shovel.
- Garment change 4: The Kohen Gadol removed his linen garments, immersed in the mikveh, and changed into a third set of golden garments, again washing his hands and feet twice.
- Evening (Tamid) offering: The Kohen Gadol completed the afternoon portion of the regular (tamid) daily offering in the golden garments. He washed his hands and feet a tenth time.

The High Priest wore five sets of garments (three golden and two white linen), immersed in the mikveh five times, and washed his hands and feet ten times. Sacrifices included two (daily) lambs, one bull, two goats, and two rams, with accompanying mincha (meal) offerings, wine libations, and three incense offerings (the regular two daily and an additional one for Yom Kippur). The Kohen Gadol entered the Holy of Holies four times. The Tetragrammaton was pronounced three times, once for each confession.

The High Priest would change his garments four times, beginning in the golden garments but changing into the Linen Garments for the two moments when he would enter the Holy of Holies (the first time to offer the blood of atonement and the incense, and the second time to retrieve the censer), and then change back again into the golden garments after each time. He would immerse in the ritual bath before each change of garments, washing his hands and his feet after removing the garments and again before putting the other set on. The linen garments were only four in number, those corresponding to the garments worn by all priests (undergarments, tunic, sash and turban), but made only of white linen, with no embroidery. They could be worn only once, new sets being made each year.

== Other occasions ==
The first 28 verses of Leviticus 16 never mention Yom Kippur; rather, they are introduced by the phrase "In this manner shall Aaron enter the holy place". Only in verses 29-34 is Yom Kippur mentioned, with a command to perform the ritual each year on Yom Kippur. Based on this structure, Vilna Gaon argued that Aaron (though not a later high priest) could enter the Holy of Holies on any occasion, as long as the ritual was followed; only on Yom Kippur was he required to perform the ritual and enter.

== Critical scholarship ==
According to textual scholars, the biblical regulations covering Yom Kippur are spliced together from multiple source texts, as indicated by the duplication of the confession over the bullock, and the incongruity in one verse stating that the high priest should not enter the Holy of Holies (with the inference that there are exceptions for certain explicitly identified festivals), and the next verse indicating that they can enter whenever they wish (as long as a specific ritual is carried out first). Although Rashi tried to find a harmonistic explanation for this incongruity, the Leviticus Rabbah maintains that it was indeed the case that the high priest could enter at any time if these rituals were carried out. Textual scholars argue that the ritual is composed from three sources, and a couple of redactional additions:

- prerequisite rituals before the high priest can enter the Holy of Holies (on any occasion), namely a sin offering and a whole offering, followed by the filling of the Holy of Holies with a cloud of incense while wearing linen garments
- regulations which establish an annual day of fasting and rest, during which the sanctuary and people are purified, without stating the ritual for doing so; this regulation is very similar to the one in the Holiness Code
- later elaborations of the ceremony, which include the sprinkling of the blood on the mercy seat, and the use of a scapegoat sent to Azazel; the same source also being responsible for small alterations to related regulations
- the redactional additions

On the basis of their assumptions, these scholars believe that the original ceremony was simply the ritual purification of the sanctuary from any accidental ritual impurity, at the start of each new year, as seen in the Book of Ezekiel. Textual scholars date this original ceremony to before the priestly source, but after JE. According to the Book of Ezekiel, the sanctuary was to be cleansed by the sprinkling of bullock's blood, on the first day of the first and of the seventh months – near the start of the civil year and of the ecclesiastical year, respectively; although the Masoretic Text of the Book of Ezekiel has the second of these cleansings on the seventh of the first month, biblical scholars regard the Septuagint, which has the second cleaning as being the first of the seventh month, as being more accurate here. It appears that during the period that the Holiness Code and the Book of Ezekiel were written, the new year began on the tenth day of the seventh month, and thus liberal biblical scholars believe that by the time the Priestly Code was compiled, the date of the new year and of the day of atonement had swapped around.

== In liturgy ==
A number of poems (piyyutim) have been composed describing the Yom Kippur Temple service. Such a poem is customarily recited as part of the Mussaf prayer in synagogue on Yom Kippur, in a section of the prayer known as the Avodah.
