= Scapegoat =

Animal which is ritually burdened

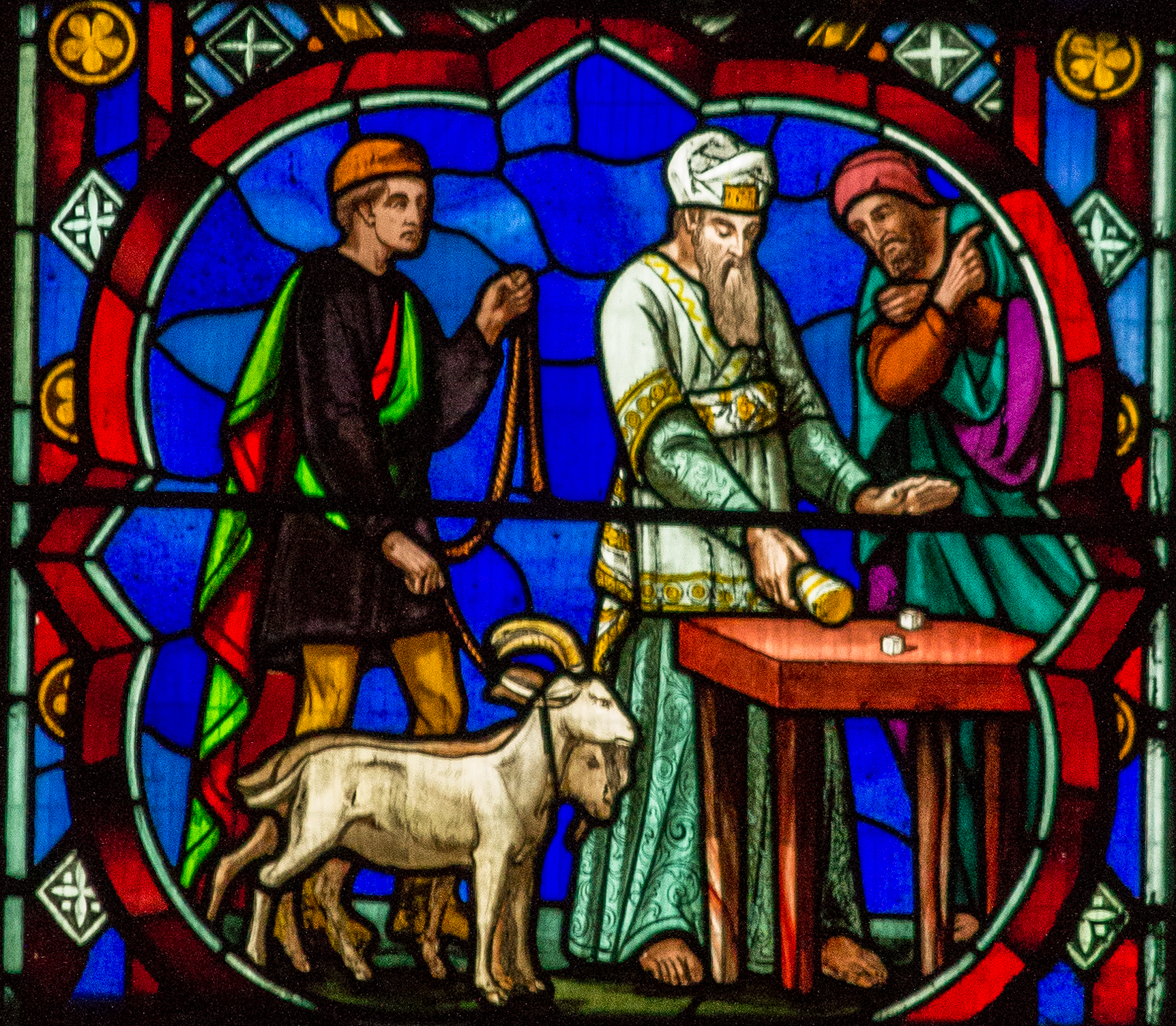
Scapegoat ceremony depicted at Lincoln Cathedral in stained glass: "[Aaron] is to take the two goats and present them before the Lord at the entrance to the tent of meeting. He is to cast lots for the two goats—one lot for the Lord and the other for the scapegoat. Aaron shall bring the goat whose lot falls to the Lord and sacrifice it for a sin offering. But the goat chosen by lot as the scapegoat shall be presented alive before the Lord to be used for making atonement by sending it into the wilderness as a scapegoat." (NIV, Leviticus 16:7–10)

A scapegoat is one of a pair of goats used in the Yom Kippur Temple service during the era of the Temple in Jerusalem. The scapegoat had a band of red wool placed on it, and was then released into the wilderness, taking with it all the sins and impurities of the people as an act of symbolic atonement. The other goat was sacrificed. The ritual is described in the Book of Leviticus of the Torah, and was performed by the High Priest of Israel (of the lineage of Aaron):

Then Aaron shall lay both his hands on the head of the live goat, and confess over it all the iniquities of the people of Israel, and all their transgressions, all their sins, putting them on the head of the goat, and sending it away into the wilderness by means of someone designated for the task. The goat shall bear on itself all their iniquities to a barren region; and the goat shall be set free in the wilderness.

— Leviticus 16:21–22, New Revised Standard Version

Practices with some similarities to the scapegoat ritual also appear in Ancient Greece and Ebla. The scapegoat ritual was performed throughout the Second Temple period, with historians such as Josephus mentioning it. With the destruction of the Second Temple in 70 AD, the scapegoat ritual became impossible to perform according to its original procedure, as there was no more Temple or High Priest.

== Origins ==
Some scholars have argued that the scapegoat ritual can be traced back to Ebla around 2400 BC, whence it spread throughout the ancient Near East.

== Etymology ==
The Hebrew word 'ăzāzêl (Hebrew: עזאזל) occurs in Leviticus 16:8. Several translations for it exist, including "scapegoat", although many modern versions leave it untranslated as a proper noun Azazel, or at least footnote "for Azazel" as an alternative reading. The passage reads:

ונתן אהרן על שני השעירם גרלות גורל אחד ליהוה וגורל אחד לעזאזל

Translation:

And Aaron shall cast lots upon the two goats: one lot for the Lord, and the other lot for Azazel.

— (JPS)

There are four major ways to take the word. The Brown–Driver–Briggs Hebrew Lexicon gives la-azazel (לעזאזל) as a reduplicative intensive of the stem ʕ-z-l, "remove", hence la-'ăzāzêl, "for entire removal", the purpose of the goat. This reading is supported by the Septuagint (Greek Old Testament) translation as "the sender away (of sins)".

The second way is to take it as a combination of "goat" and "go away", leading to "scapegoat." Early English Christian Bible versions follow the translation of the Septuagint and Latin Vulgate, which interpret azazel as "the goat that departs" (Greek tragos apopompaios, "goat sent out", Latin caper emissarius, "emissary goat"). William Tyndale rendered the Latin as "(e)scape goat" in his 1530 English translation of the Bible. This translation was followed by subsequent versions up through the King James Version of the Bible in 1611: "And Aaron shall cast lots upon the two goats; one lot for the Lord, and the other lot for the scapegoat."

The third way to take it is as a name for the place that the goat is sent to. Jewish sources in the Talmud (Yoma 6:4,67b) give the etymology of azazel as a compound of az, strong or rough, and el, mighty, that the goat was sent to the most rugged or strongest of mountains.

A fourth line of thought is that Azazel is the name of a fallen angel, an angelic force, or a pagan deity. This can be seen in the pseudepigraphical Book of Enoch, which was broadly contemporary with the Septuagint and the Targums.

And Azazel taught men to make swords, and knives, and shields, and breastplates, and made known to them the metals of the earth and the art of working them, and bracelets, and ornaments, and the use of antimony, and the beautifying of the eyelids, and all kinds of costly stones, and all colouring tinctures.

— Enoch 8:1, translation by R. H. Charles.

== Ancient Judaism ==
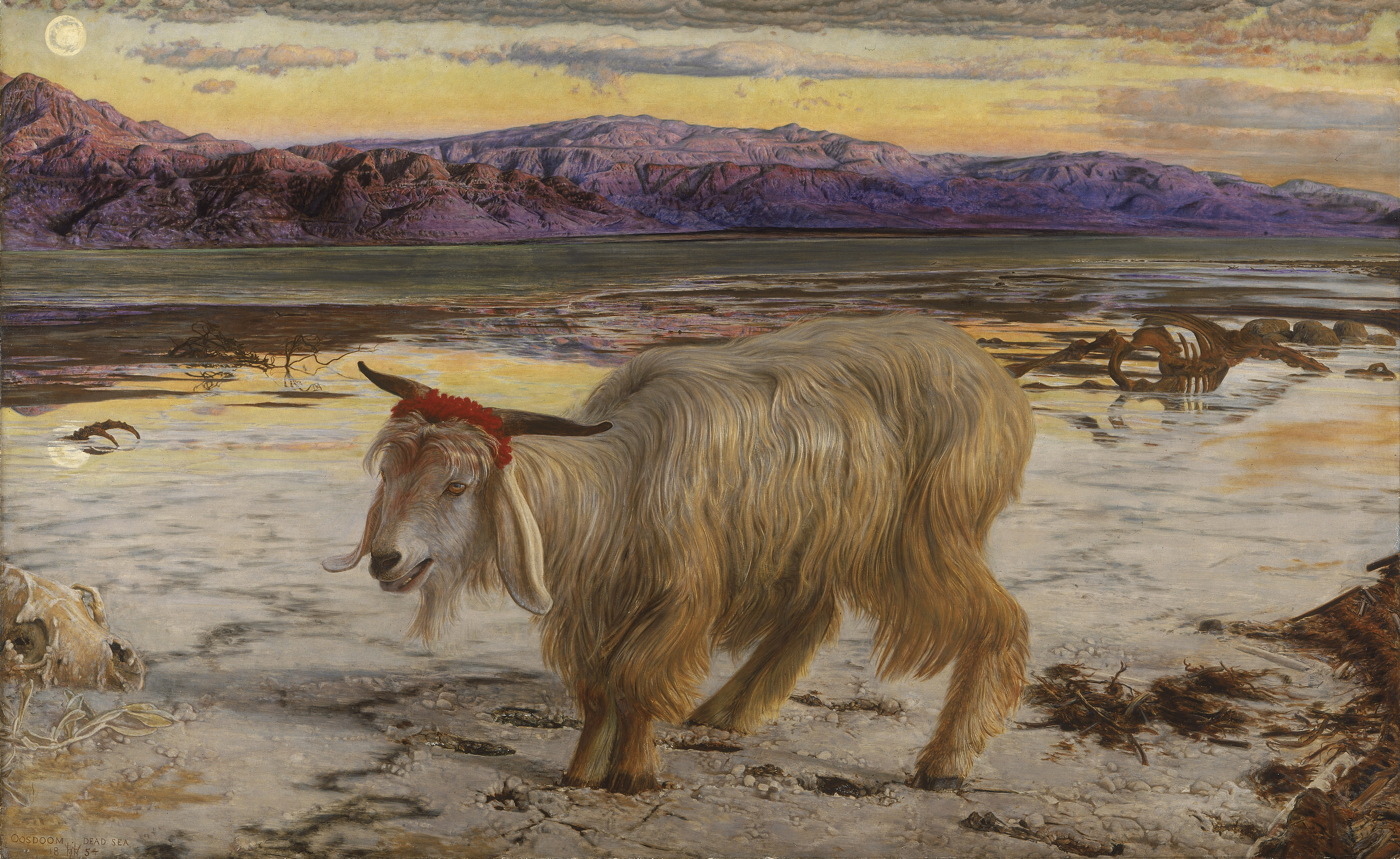
The Scapegoat, by William Holman Hunt, 1854

The scapegoat was a goat that was designated (Hebrew: לַעֲזָאזֵֽל) la-'aza'zeyl; "for absolute removal" (for symbolic removal of the people's sins with the literal removal of the goat), and outcast in the desert as part of the Yom Kippur Temple service at the Temple in Jerusalem. The origins are attributed to the Exodus with the original Tabernacle, and continued through the times of the First Temple and Second Temple.

Once a year, on Yom Kippur, the High Priest of Israel sacrificed a bull as a sin offering to atone for sins he may have committed unintentionally throughout the year. Subsequently he took two goats and presented them at the door of the tabernacle. Two goats were chosen by lot: one to be "for YHWH", which was offered as a blood sacrifice, and the other to be the scapegoat to be sent away into the wilderness. The blood of the slain goat was taken into the Holy of Holies behind the sacred veil and sprinkled on the mercy seat, the lid of the ark of the covenant. Later in the ceremonies of the day, the High Priest confessed the sins of the Israelites to God placing them figuratively on the head of the other goat, the scapegoat, who would symbolically "take them away". A band of red wool was placed on the scapegoat's head. While any Jew could lead the scapegoat into the wilderness, in practice, a priest was generally picked for the task. The tractate Yoma of the Mishnah goes into detail about the procedure and its meaning.

At some point in the Second Temple period (538 BC – 70 AD), the procedure changed to explicitly throw the scapegoat off a cliff upon taking it to the wilderness, most likely to prevent the sins from "returning" as an unlucky omen. This doesn't seem to have actually been mandatory, and the High Priest could continue the service as soon as the goat was banished, rather than having to wait for a report of the scapegoat dying.

== Christian perspectives ==
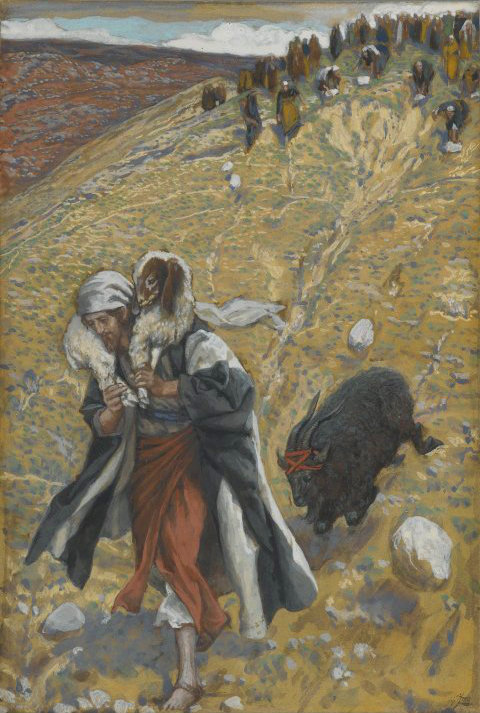
Agnus-Dei: The Scapegoat (Agnus-Dei. Le bouc émissaire), by James Tissot

The early Christian non-canonical work the Epistle of Barnabas (70 AD – 135 AD) reworks much of the Jewish scriptures to actually be symbolic prophecies of the coming of Christianity, heavily drawing on typology to show that Old Testament "types" are omens of a later fulfillment in Christianity. It depicts the scapegoat ritual as a symbolic foretelling of the fate of Jesus and of Christians, with both the sacrificed goat and the scapegoat of the same "type" of being destined to suffer. It draws a parallel between the red wool band and the crown of thorns, with both Jesus and the scapegoat cursed yet crowned. It indicates to Christian readers that part of following Jesus will be the necessity of suffering.

Pay attention to what he commands: "Take two fine goats who are alike and offer them as a sacrifice; and let the priest take one of them as a whole burnt offering for sins. But what will they do with the other? "The other," he says, "is cursed." Pay attention to how the type of Jesus is revealed. "And all of you shall spit on it and pierce it and wrap a piece of scarlet wool around its head, and so let it be cast into the wilderness." (...) Pay attention: "The one they take to the altar, but the other is cursed," and the one that is cursed is crowned. For then they will see him in that day wearing a long scarlet robe around his flesh, and they will say, "Is this not the one we once crucified, despising, piercing, and spitting on him? Truly this is the one who was saying at the time that he was himself the Son of God." For how is he like that one? This is why "the goats are alike, fine, and equal," that when they see him coming at that time, they may be amazed at how much he is like the goat. See then the type of Jesus who was about to suffer. But why do they place the wool in the midst of the thorns? This is a type of Jesus established for the church, because whoever wishes to remove the scarlet wool must suffer greatly (...). And so he says: those who wish to see me and touch my kingdom must take hold of me through pain and suffering.

— Epistle of Barnabas 6:6-11

== Similar practices ==
=== Ancient Syria ===
A concept superficially similar to the biblical scapegoat is attested in two ritual texts of the 24th century BC archived at Ebla. They were connected with ritual purification on the occasion of the king's wedding. In them, a she-goat with a silver bracelet hung from her neck was driven forth into the wasteland of "Alini"; "we" in the report of the ritual involves the whole community. Such "elimination rites", in which an animal, without confession of sins, is the vehicle of evils (not sins) that are chased from the community are widely attested in the Ancient Near East.

=== Ancient Greece ===
Ancient Greeks practised scapegoating rituals in exceptional times based on the belief that the repudiation of one or two individuals would save the whole community. Scapegoating was practiced with different rituals across ancient Greece for different reasons but was mainly used during extraordinary circumstances such as famine, drought, or plague. The scapegoat would usually be an individual of lower society such as a criminal, slave, or poor person and was referred to as the pharmakos, katharma or peripsima.

There is a dichotomy, however, in the individuals used as scapegoats in mythical tales and the ones used in the actual rituals. In mythical tales, it was stressed that someone of high importance had to be sacrificed if the whole society were to benefit from the aversion of catastrophe (usually a king or the king's children). However, since no king or person of importance would be willing to sacrifice himself or his children, the scapegoat in actual rituals would be someone of lower society who would be given value through special treatment such as fine clothes and dining before the sacrificial ceremony.

Sacrificial ceremonies varied across Greece depending on the festival and type of catastrophe. In Abdera, for example, a poor man was feasted and led around the walls of the city once before being chased out with stones. In Massalia, a poor man was feasted for a year and then cast out of the city in order to stop a plague. The scholia refer to the pharmakos being killed, but many scholars reject this and argue that the earliest evidence (the fragments of the iambic satirist Hipponax) show the pharmakos being only stoned, beaten, and driven from the community.

== See also ==
- Dosmoche – "The Festival of the Scapegoat" (Tibetan Buddhism)
- Kapparot
- Judas goat
- Sin-eater
- Whipping boy
