= Confession (Judaism) =

Step in the process of atonement in Judaism

In Judaism, confession (Hebrew: וִדּוּי, romanized: vīddūy) is a step in the process of atonement during which a Jew admits to committing a sin before God. In sins between a Jew and God, the confession must be done without others present (The Talmud calls confession in front of another a show of disrespect). On the other hand, confession of sins done to another person may be done publicly, and in fact Maimonides calls such confession "immensely praiseworthy".

The confession of a sin in itself does not bring immediate forgiveness. Rather, it is one component of repentance in Judaism, which can lead to forgiveness.

== Hebrew Bible ==
Vidui is not found as a noun in the Hebrew Bible, but the concept of confession and the hithpael verb form of yadah (ידה) – from which vidui is derived – are found, and seems to fall into the category of speech actions.

Individuals might confess their sins or their people's sins as a precondition to achieving forgiveness, while confession was required along with certain sin-offerings in the Temple. In Leviticus 16:21, the people's sins were confessed "on the head" of the scapegoat, which then was said to carry those sins out of the camp.

== The structure of a confession ==
Maimonides writes:

How does one confess? One says: "Please God! I have sinned, committed iniquity, rebelled. I have done [such-and-such] and I regret it, and I am ashamed of my deeds, and I shall never return to such a deed." That is the essence of confession.

== In prayer ==
In addition to each person's own personal confessions, in many communities a form of confession has been added to the standard prayer service.

The standard confession text begins by referring to the prayer that has proceeded it:

Our God and God of our ancestors, may our prayer come before you... for we are not so shameless and stiff-necked as to say before You... that we are righteous and have not sinned; rather, we and our ancestors have sinned.

This is followed by a list of specific sins which the individual or community may have committed.

After the list comes a statement of regret for the sins. For example, the standard short confession concludes as follows:

We have strayed from Your good commandments and laws, and it was not worthwhile for us. You are righteous in all that comes upon us, for You have done truth while we have done evil.

=== Alphabetical texts ===
There are two commonly recited confession texts: the short confession (וידוי הקטן) and the long confession (וידוי הגדול). Both include a list of sins that a person confesses to in the order of the alephbet. The short confession lists one sin per letter. Regarding the long confession, there are several customs: In the siddurim of Rav Saadia Gaon and Maimonides, as well is in the contemporary Yemenite prayer book, there are merely a few lines of Al Cheyt in no specific order. In the siddur of Rav Amram Gaon, as well as in the contemporary Sephardic rite, Italian Nusach and Romaniote rite, as well as in the medieval French rite and most early manuscripts of the Ashkenazic rite, it is a single acrostic. In later Ashkenazic manuscripts and all Ashkenazic printed machzorim, al cheyt follows a double acrostic. A number of purposes have been suggested for the alphabetical arrangement: (Note: Reform liturgy has attempted to re-create the alphabetic effect in English. E.g., Gates of Repentance: The New Union Prayerbook for the Days of Awe recites Ashamnu only twice on Yom Kippur, the traditional Hebrew text paired with a non-literal translation: "The sins of arrogance, bigotry, and cynicism" and concluding with "violence, weakness of will, xenophobia, we yielded to temptation, and showed zeal for bad causes" and with only a partial listing, "We are arrogant, brutal, careless, destructive, egocentric, ... [ending the list with] insolent, and joyless.... Our sins are an alphabet of woe.")

- To aid in memorizing the list
- To provide a more comprehensive list of sins, and better remind the confessor of additional sins they have committed which they can add to the list
- To symbolize that one has confessed for any possible sin

While not everyone has committed every sin in the standard confession texts, they are worded in the plural ("we have sinned"). They are thus recited in the name of the whole Jewish people, and it is presumably true that every sin mentioned has been committed by at least one Jew.

During confession the congregant stands, with head bowed in regret or shame, and with the mention of each sin, thumps his fist over his heart. Some individuals might quickly add (silently or in a whisper) additional sins, not in the traditional list, beginning with the same letters.

With reference to the Ashkenaz text, it has been said, "out of the 44 statements that make up the Al Cheyt, twelve deal with sins rooted in speech (five in Ashamnu). Only four statements relate to transgressions committed by man against God in the strict sense (only two in the Ashamnu text). Dominating both confessional texts are general expressions of sin (fifteen in Al Cheyt and seventeen in Ashamnu)."

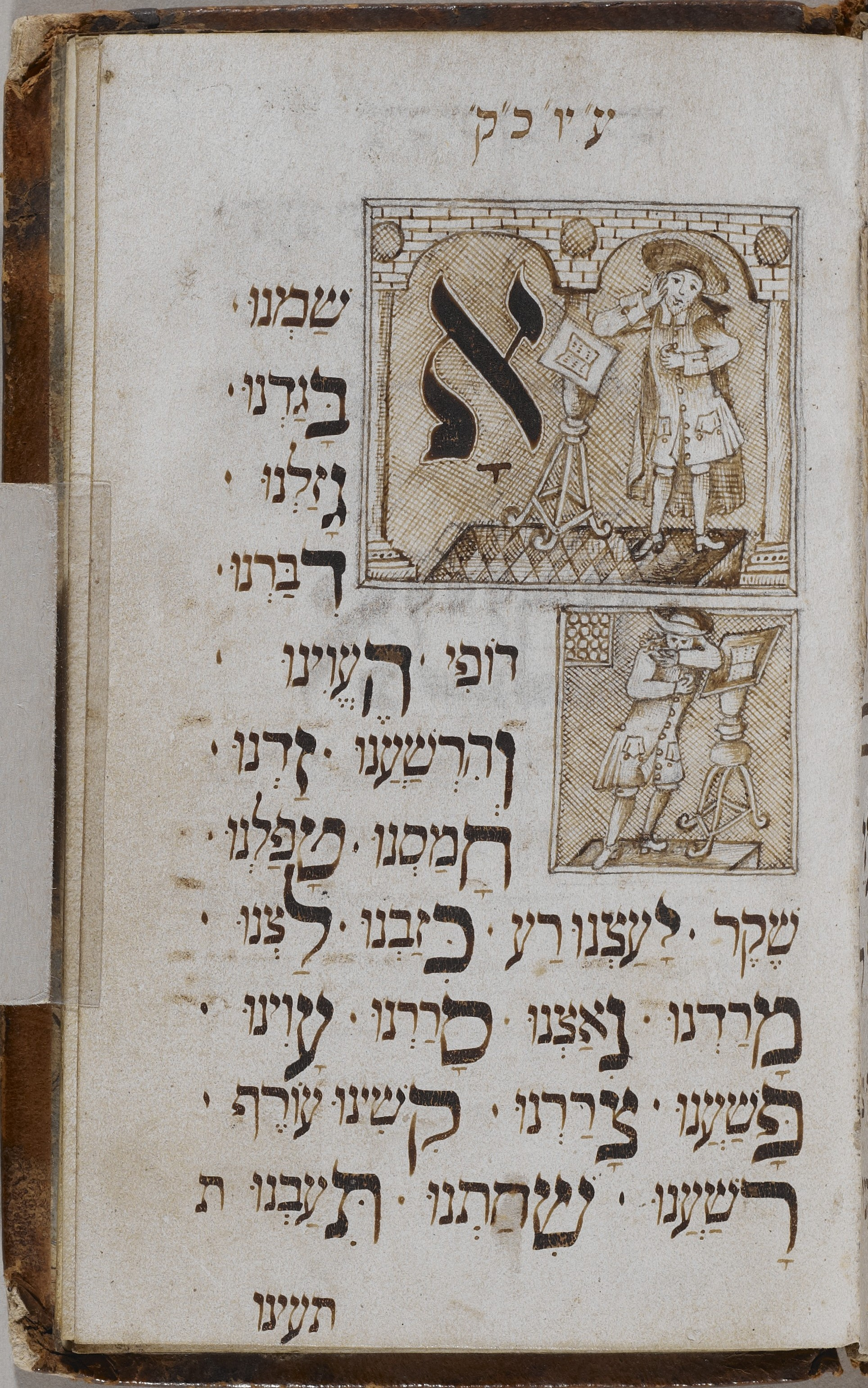
Illuminated Ashamnu by Nathan [ben Samson] of Mezhyrich (1723).

=== Ashamnu, the short confession ===
This formula begins "We have incurred guilt, we have betrayed, we have stolen, we have spoken falsely, etc." ("... ,אָשַמנוּ, בָּגַדְנוּ, גָזֵלְנוּ"). It is commonly known by its first word, Ashamnu (also transliterated Oshamnu). An early form of this confession is found most directly in Daniel 9:5–19; see especially verses 5, 9, 18–19, where the supplicant acknowledges himself meritless, and entreats for God's forgiveness based only on God's own merit, and that God's name should not be tarnished among the nations.

Ashamnu is an alphabetic acrostic, consisting of 24 lines (the last letter of the alphabet, תּ (tav), used three times). Each sin is usually expressed as one word (a few are two words), a verb in the past tense, first person plural. The last two sins (repetitions of the letter תּ) are "תָּעִינוּ תִּעְתָּעְנוּ" (taw'inu, titawnu) are usually translated as: "We went astray, We led others astray". Occasionally the last word is translated as "You [i.e. God] allowed us to go astray"—the ArtScroll siddur uses both possibilities, the point being that the last word is an unusual form (not found in the Bible) that suggests a positive determination to go astray, the misuse of free will. However, the translation of "You let us go astray" has been criticized as an error, and it has been suggested that the last word means "we have scoffed" or "we have mocked" or "we tricked" or "we misled others".

The short confession is said by Nusach Sefard and most Sephardic communities (except Spanish and Portuguese) as a portion of Tachanun (daily supplications) immediately following the Amidah, and by all communities on Yom Kippur and during the recitation of Selichot. It is recited standing and quietly, except during the chazzan's repetition on Yom Kippur when it is customary to recite it aloud. In many congregations (mainly Ashkenazi ones), it is even customarily sung on this date. This form first appeared in the prayerbook of the Amram Gaon (8th century).

=== Al Chet, the long confession ===
The long confession, known as Al Chet (also Al Cheyt, Al Hayt or Al Ḥet; עֵל חֵטְא 'For the sin ...'), is said only on Yom Kippur, and in Ashkenazic communities, it also recited by a groom on the day of his wedding in the last prayer before the Chuppah.

Each line begins "For the sin we committed before You through ..." (על חטא שחטאנוּ לפניך בּ־); the prefix בּ־ meaning 'through' or 'by means of', and the rest of that word is in alphabetic sequence: בּאנס ('compulsion'), בּבלי דעת ('ignorance'), and so on. In the siddurim of Rav Saadia Gaon and Maimonides, as well is in the contemporary Yemenite prayer book, there are merely a few lines of Al Cheyt in no specific order. In the siddur of Rav Amram Gaon, as well as in the contemporary Sephardic rite, Italian Nusach and Romaniote rite, as well as in the medieval French rite and most early manuscripts of the Ashkenazic rite, it is a single acrostic. In later Ashkenazic manuscripts and all Ashkenazic printed machzorim, al cheyt follows a double acrostic.

This is then followed by a non-acrostic list whose lines begin "And for the sin for which we are"—here naming the Temple offering or the punishment (including lashing and death) that might be imposed. And concluding with a brief categorization of sins (such as the violation of a positive commandment, or of a negative commandment, or whether the sin can or cannot be remedied, as well as those we do not remember committing).

=== Musical treatment ===
It is traditional that both Ashamnu and Al Cheyt are chanted in a somewhat upbeat melody, in the Ashkenaz tradition similar to one associated with the triumphant Song at the Red Sea. This may seem unusual, as one might have expected a confession of sins to be chanted as a dirge. But an uplifting melody is common in all Jewish traditions. One explanation is that by this confession, "the worshipper is stimulated to a mood of victory and a sense of hopeful living in the face of an unknown and unpredictable future." Or that, by making this confession and repenting, "our sins are transformed into merits."

== Deathbed confession ==
The Talmud teaches that "if one falls sick and his life is in danger, he is told: 'Make confession, for all who are sentenced to death make confession.'" Masechet Semachot adds that "When someone is approaching death, we tell him to confess before he dies, adding that on the one hand, many people confessed and did not die, whilst on the other, there are many who did not confess and died, and there are many who walk in the street and confess; because on the merit of confession you will live." Similar language is employed in the Shulchan Aruch's codification where it is ruled that the following text should be recited to the terminally ill: "Many have confessed but have not died; and many who have not confessed died. And many who are walking outside in the marketplace confess. By the merit of your confession, you shall live. And all who confess have a place in the World-to-Come."

The patient is then to recite the deathbed Viduy. There is an abbreviated form intended for those in a severely weakened state and an elongated form, "obviously if the sick person wishes to add more to his confession—even the Viduy of Yom Kippur—he is permitted to do so". Afterwards it is also encouraged for the patient to recite the Shema, enunciate acceptance of the Thirteen Principles of Faith and to donate some money to charity.
