= Gloria (Vivaldi) =

Set of choral compositions

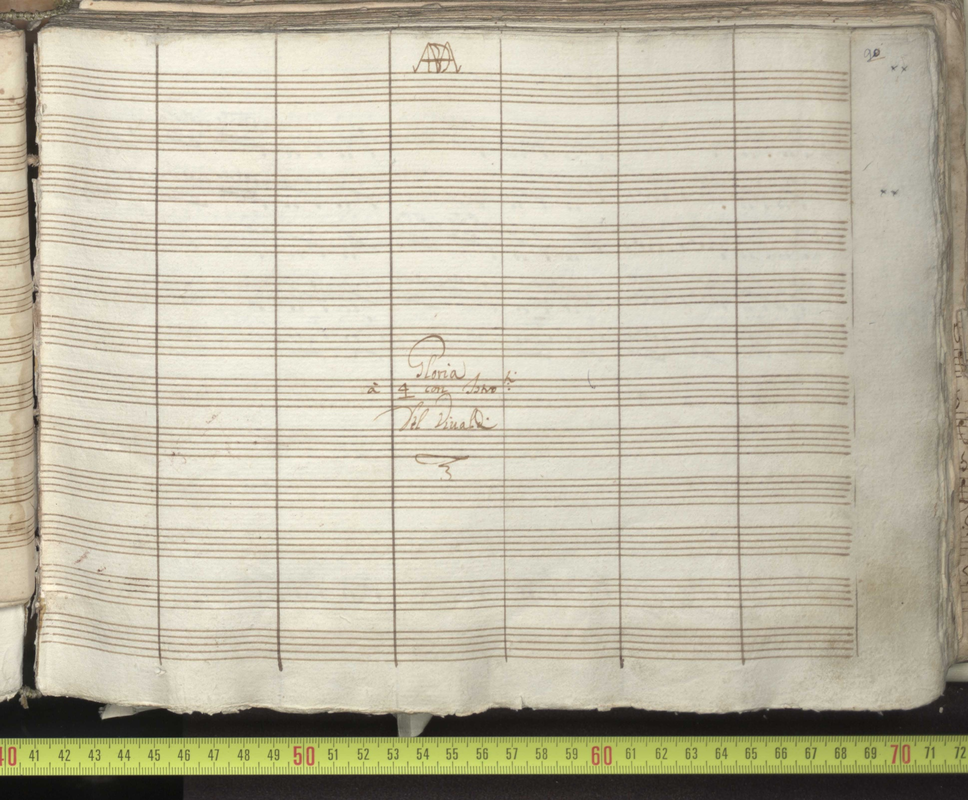
From the holograph manuscript of the RV 589.

Antonio Vivaldi wrote at least three Gloria compositions, settings of the hymn Gloria in excelsis Deo, with words probably dating back to the 4th century, and an integral part of the mass ordinary. Two of them have survived: RV 588 and RV 589, both in D Major. A third, RV 590, is mentioned only in the Kreuzherren catalogue and presumed lost. The RV 589 Gloria is a familiar and popular piece among sacred works by Vivaldi. It was probably written at about the same time as the RV 588, possibly in 1715.

== Introduction ==
As with other choral pieces the composer, Vivaldi, wrote many introduzioni (introductory motets) that were to be performed before the Gloria itself. Four introduzioni exist for these Glorias: Cur Sagittas (RV 637), Jubilate, o amoeni cori (RV 639) (the last movement of which is compositionally tied with the first movement of RV 588), Longe Mala, Umbrae, Terrores (RV 640), and Ostro Picta (RV 642).

== Settings ==
=== RV 588 ===
The lesser known of the two surviving Glorias, RV 588 was most likely composed during Vivaldi's employment at the Pio Ospedale della Pietà, known for its advanced choral ensemble. The first movement is interwoven with the last aria of RV 639, as explained above. The date of composition between this Gloria and RV 589 is still disputed, but both show compositional inspiration from each other.

RV 588 borrows extensively from a double orchestra-and-choir setting of the same text by Giovanni Maria Ruggieri (which will henceforth in this article be referred by its RV cataloguing number of RV. Anh. 23). Many movements show inspiration from this composition, and two movements ("Qui Tollis" and "Cum Sancto Spiritu") are plagiarised from the original Ruggieri setting (although "Qui Tollis" completely omits the second coro (chorus), and "Cum Sancto Spiritu" is slightly modified). The first movement of RV 588 is also an extended version of RV Anh. 23, sans the second coro employed in RV Anh. 23, among other musical modifications. The second movements of both RV 588 and RV 589 ("Et in Terra Pax") both show chromatic patterns and key modulations similar to that of the second movement of RV Anh. 23.

==== Movements ====
1. Gloria in excelsis Deo
2. Et in terra pax
3. Laudamus te (Sopranos I and II)
4. Gratias agimus tibi (Chorus)
5. Propter magnam gloria (Chorus)
6. Domine Deus (Soprano)
7. Domine, Fili unigenite (Chorus)
8. Domine Deus, Agnus Dei (Alto, Chorus)
9. Qui tollis peccata mundi (Chorus)
10. Qui sedes ad dexteram Patris (Mezzo Soprano)
11. Quoniam tu solus sanctus (Chorus)
12. Cum Sancto Spiritu (Chorus)

=== RV 589 ===
This is the better-known setting of the Gloria, simply known as the Vivaldi "Gloria" because of its outstanding popularity. This piece, along with its mother composition RV 588, was composed at the same time during Vivaldi's employment at the Pietà. Two introduzioni exist as explained above.

As in RV 588, there exists evidence of influence by RV Anh. 23: the first movement's chorus shares similar key modulations to that of the first movement of RV 588, only modified to fit a duple meter instead of the triple meter of RV 588. Motivic material present in the orchestral parts of either piece are also shared, including octave jumps in the opening motives of the piece. The second movement is significantly more chromatic in RV 589, but nonetheless is texturally similar to the setting present in RV Anh. 23, with the use of repeating rhythmic figures underneath harmonic motion. The "Qui Tollis" movement of RV 589 is rhythmically similar to the first few measures of RV 588 (and ultimately RV Anh. 23). The last movement, "Cum Sancto Spiritu", is essentially an "updated" version of movement present in both RV Anh. 23 and RV 588, except extensively harmonically modified, becoming more chromatic than its predecessors, reflecting a maturity in Vivaldi's output and the emerging style of the late Italian Baroque.

==== Movements ====
Domine Deus
Domine Deus for soprano, oboe and string orchestra. Courtesy of Monora.

1. Gloria (Chorus)
2. Et in terra pax (Chorus)
3. Laudamus te (Sopranos I and II)
4. Gratias agimus tibi (Chorus)
5. Propter magnam gloriam (Chorus)
6. Domine Deus (Soprano)
7. Domine, Fili unigenite (Chorus)
8. Domine Deus, Agnus Dei (Contralto and Chorus)
9. Qui tollis peccata mundi (Chorus)
10. Qui sedes ad dexteram Patris (Contralto)
11. Quoniam tu solus sanctus (Chorus)
12. Cum Sancto Spiritu (Chorus)

=== RV 590 ===
Little information exists on this lost work other than its instrumentation (five voices and oboes in trombae) in the Kreuzherren catalogue. There is no other source of information; not even its possible key can be conjectured. In the Ryom-Verzeichnis catalogue, it is considered lost.

=== RV Anh. 23 ===
As stated above, this Gloria for two cori (orchestras) was written by Giovanni Maria Ruggieri. This composition, probably for a Venetian church during a festival, is dated September 9, 1708 N.S. This Gloria provided much inspiration for Vivaldi's two settings and for other Glorias by other composers at the time, who may have used it in their settings.

==== Movements ====
1. Gloria in excelsis Deo (Chorus)
2. Et in terra pax (Seven Bass soloists)
3. Laudamus te (Chorus, Sopranos I and II, Tenor)
4. Gratias agimus tibi (Chorus)
5. Propter Magnam Gloriam (Chorus)
6. Domine Deus (Sopranos I and II and Bass from first coro, Sopranos III and VI and Bass from second coro)
7. Domine, Fili unigenite (Chorus)
8. Domine Deus, Agnus Dei (Chorus)
9. Qui tollis peccata mundi (Chorus)
10. Qui sedes ad dexteram Patris (Chorus and Soprano, Contralto, and Tenor)
11. Quoniam tu solus sanctus (Chorus)
12. Cum Sancto Spiritu (Chorus)

== Popularity ==
The Glorias remained relatively unknown until RV 589's revival by Alfredo Casella during "Vivaldi Week" in Siena (1939), along with the composer's setting of the Stabat Mater (RV 621). RV 589 enjoys well-founded popularity and is performed at many sacred events, including Christmas. It has been recorded on almost one hundred CDs, sometimes paired with Bach's Magnificat (BWV 243), Vivaldi's own Magnificat settings (RV 610–611), or Vivaldi's Beatus Vir (RV 597). RV 588, however, has had little success and has been published in few albums. Attempts to attract more attention to RV 588 and other sacred Vivaldi works (most notably by The King's Consort) are underway.

As with many other pieces of the Baroque era, RV 589 (and its lesser-known companion RV 588) have been performed in historically informed instrumentation, even with the use of an all-female choir to simulate choral conditions at the Pietà. There are several different editions, and choirs need to exercise caution when combining different vocal and orchestral editions.

RV 589 has also been used in a number of films. The first movement featured in the 1996 Scott Hicks film Shine about pianist David Helfgott, as well as in the 2011 film The Hunter. An adaptation of the second movement was used in the final climactic scenes of the 1985 Andrei Konchalovsky film Runaway Train.

== Editions ==
- Vivaldi: Gloria in D RV 589, Stuttgart Carus-Verlag 1971
