= Psalm 127 =

Biblical psalm

- "Except the Lord build the house"
- Song of Ascents
- Arms of the city council of Edinburgh, with the Latin motto Nisi Dominus Frustra ("Without the Lord, [all is] in vain")
- Other name: Psalm 126 (Vulgate); Nisi Dominus; "Wo Gott zum Haus"
- Language: Hebrew (original)

Psalm 127
- ← Psalm 126 Psalm 128 →
- Book: Book of Psalms
- Hebrew Bible part: Ketuvim
- Order in the Hebrew part: 1
- Category: Sifrei Emet
- Christian Bible part: Old Testament
- Order in the Christian part: 19

Psalm 127 is the 127th psalm of the Book of Psalms, beginning in English in the King James Version: "Except the Lord build the house". In Latin, it is known by a two-word incipit, "Nisi Dominus". It is one of 15 "Songs of Ascents" and the only one among them attributed to Solomon rather than David.

In the slightly different numbering system used in the Greek Septuagint and the Latin Vulgate, this psalm is Psalm 126.

The text is divided into five verses. The first two express the notion that "without God, all is in vain", popularly summarized in Latin in the motto Nisi Dominus Frustra. The remaining three verses describe progeny as God's blessing.

The psalm forms a regular part of Jewish, Catholic, Lutheran, Anglican and other Protestant liturgies. The Vulgate text Nisi Dominus was set to music numerous times during the Renaissance and Baroque periods, often as part of vespers, including Claudio Monteverdi's ten-part setting as part of his 1610 Vespro della Beata Vergine, Marc-Antoine Charpentier, (3 sets), H 150, H 160, H 231, Handel's Nisi Dominus (1707) and two settings by Antonio Vivaldi. Composers such as Adam Gumpelzhaimer and Heinrich Schütz set the German "Wo Gott zum Haus".

== Authorship ==
According to Jewish tradition, Psalm 127 was written by David and dedicated to his son Solomon, who would build the First Temple. According to Radak, verses 3–5, which reference "sons", express David's feelings about his son Solomon; according to Rashi, these verses refer to the students of a Torah scholar, who are called his "sons".

The psalm's superscription calls it "of Solomon", but Christian theologian Albert Barnes noted that "in the Syriac Version, the title is, "From the Psalms of the Ascent; spoken by David concerning Solomon; it was spoken also of Haggai and Zechariah, who urged the rebuilding of the Temple". The Authorized Version describes the psalm as "a Song of degrees for Solomon", and Wycliffe's translators recognised both options. Isaac Gottlieb of Bar Ilan University suggests that the reference in verse 2 to "his beloved" (yedido) "recalls Solomon's other name, Yedidiah".

== Themes ==
Charles Spurgeon calls Psalm 127 "The Builder's Psalm", noting the similarity between the Hebrew words for sons (banim) and builders (bonim). He writes:

We are here taught that builders of houses and cities, systems and fortunes, empires and churches all labour in vain without the Lord; but under the divine favour they enjoy perfect rest. Sons, who are in the Hebrew called "builders", are set forth as building up families under the same divine blessing, to the great honour and happiness of their parents.

Spurgeon also quotes the English preacher Henry Smith (1560–1591): "Well doth David call children 'arrows' [v. 4]; for if they be well bred, they shoot at their parents' enemies; and if they be evil bred, they shoot at their parents".

The Midrash Tehillim interprets the opening verses of the psalm as referring to teachers and students of Torah. On the watchmen of the city mentioned in verse 1, Rabbi Hiyya, Rabbi Yosi, and Rabbi Ammi said, "The [true] watchmen of the city are the teachers of Scripture and instructors of Oral Law". On "the Lord gives" in verse 2, the Midrash explains that God "gives" life in the world to come to the wives of Torah scholars because they deprive themselves of sleep to support their husbands.

== As part of the structure of the Psalms of Ascents ==
One Bible scholar, Ernst Wilhelm Hengstenberg, made the following observations of how Psalm 127 is the center of a delicate structure in the Psalms of Ascents, Psalms 120 to 134.

The whole is grouped around Psalm 127, which was composed by Solomon, which stands in the middle between the first and the last of the pilgrim psalms. On each side there stands a group of seven Pilgrim psalms, consisting of two by David and five anonymous ones. Each group of seven contains the name Yahweh 24 times.

== Translation ==
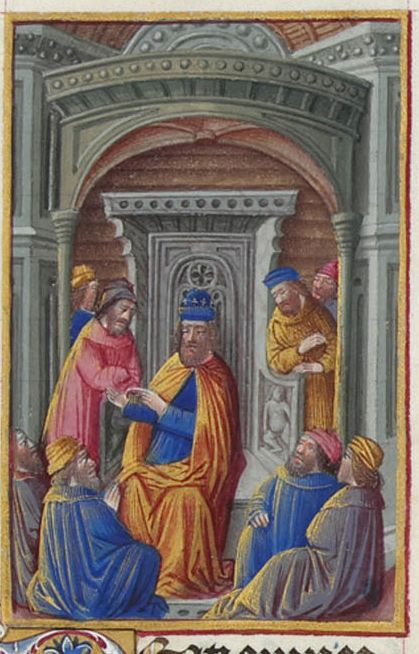
Folio 56r, Psalm CXXVII

The translation of the psalm offers difficulties, especially in verses 2 and 4. Jerome, in a letter to Marcella (dated 384 AD), laments that Origen's notes on this psalm were no longer extant, and discusses the various possible translations of לֶחֶם הָעֲצָבִים (KJV "bread of sorrows", after the panem doloris of Vulgata Clementina; Jerome's own translation was panem idolorum, "bread of idols", following the Septuagint (LXX), and of בְּנֵי הַנְּעוּרִֽים (KJV "children of the youth", translated in LXX as υἱοὶ τῶν ἐκτετιναγμένων "children of the outcast").

There are two possible interpretations of the phrase כֵּן יִתֵּן לִֽידִידֹו שֵׁנָֽא (KJV: "for so he giveth his beloved sleep"): The word "sleep" may either be the direct object (as in KJV, following LXX and Vulgate), or an accusative used adverbially, "in sleep", i.e. "while they are asleep". The latter interpretation fits the context of the verse much better, contrasting the "beloved of the Lord" who receive success without effort, as it were "while they sleep" with the sorrowful and fruitless toil of those not so blessed, a sentiment paralleled by Proverbs 10:22 (KJV "The blessing of the LORD, it maketh rich, and he addeth no sorrow with it."). Keil and Delitzsch (1883) accept the reading of the accusative as adverbial, paraphrasing "God gives to His beloved in sleep, i.e., without restless self-activity, in a state of self-forgetful renunciation, and modest, calm surrender to Him".

However, Alexander Kirkpatrick in the Cambridge Bible for Schools and Colleges (1906) argues that while the reading "So he giveth unto his beloved in sleep" fits the context, the natural translation of the Hebrew text is still the one given by the ancient translators, suggesting that the Hebrew text as transmitted has been corrupted (which would make the LXX and Vulgate readings not so much "mistranslations" as correct translations of an already corrupted reading).

English translations have been reluctant to emend the translation, due to the long-standing association of this verse with sleep being the gift of God. Abraham Cronbach (1933) refers to this as "one of those glorious mistranslations, a mistranslation which enabled Mrs. Browning to write one of the tenderest poems in the English language", referring to Elizabeth Barrett Browning's poem The Sleep, which uses "He giveth his beloved Sleep" as the last line of each stanza.

Keil and Delitzsch (1883) take שֶׁבֶת, "to sit up", as confirmation for the assumption, also suggested by 1 Samuel 20:24, that the custom of the Hebrews before the Hellenistic period was to take their meals sitting up, and not reclining as was the Greco-Roman custom.

== Uses ==
=== Judaism ===
In Judaism, Psalm 127 is recited in some communities as part of the series of psalms read after the Shabbat afternoon service between Sukkot and Shabbat HaGadol.

It is also recited as a prayer for protection of a newborn infant.

=== Catholic Church ===
Since the early Middle Ages, this psalm was traditionally recited or sung at the Office of None during the week, specifically from Tuesday until Saturday between Psalm 126 and Psalm 128, following the Rule of St. Benedict. In the current texts of the Liturgy of the Hours, Psalm 127 is recited at Vespers on the third Wednesday of the four-week liturgical cycle. It is also used at Second Vespers in the Common texts for the feasts of both the Blessed Virgin Mary and of all Holy Women.

=== Coptic Orthodox Church ===
In the Agpeya, the Coptic Church's book of hours, this psalm is prayed in the office of Vespers and the second watch of the Midnight office.

=== Protestantism ===
The pro-natalist Quiverfull movement invokes the less quoted latter part of the psalm, verses 3–5 concerning the blessings and advantages of numerous offspring, as one of the foundations for their stance and takes its name from the last verse ("Happy is the man that hath his quiver full of them [i.e. sons]").

== Musical settings ==
=== In Latin ===
The Vulgate text of the psalm, Nisi Dominus, has been set to music many times, often as part of vespers services. Settings from the classical period use the text of the Sixto-Clementine Vulgate of 1592, which groups Cum dederit dilectis suis somnum ("as he gives sleep to those in whom he delights") with verse 3 rather than verse 2 (as opposed to Jerome's text, and most modern translations, grouping the phrase with verse 2). Notable compositions include:

- Orlando di Lasso, a capella motet for five voices, (published in 1562).
- Hans Leo Hassler, a capella motet, published in Cantiones sacrae, 1591.
- Giovanni Matteo Asola, a capella setting published in 1599.
- Monteverdi's "Nisi Dominus" for a ten-part choir, part of Vespro della Beata Vergine (1610).
- Giovanni Simone Mayr, motet for bass soloist and chorus.
- Alessandro Grandi, motet with trombones and basso continuo, published in 1630
- Francesco Cavalli, setting for four parts and strings, published in Musiche Sacre Concernenti, Venice, (1656).
- Giovanni Giacomo Arrigoni, motet "Nisi Dominus", published in 1663
- Marc-Antoine Charpentier :
  - "Nisi Dominus", grand motet for soloists, chorus, 2 treble instruments and continuo H.150 (? early 1670).
  - "Nisi Dominus", grand motet for soloists, chorus and continuo H.160 - 160 a (? early 1670).
  - "Nisi Dominus", motet for 3 voices, 2 treble instruments and continuo H.231 (date unknown).
- Biber, cantata for 2 voices, violin and b.c. (after 1676).
- Handel's "Nisi Dominus", believed to have been written for a vespers service in 1707
- Henry Desmarest, grand motet "Nisi Dominus" (17..).
- Jan Dismas Zelenka, motet "Nisi Dominus" ZWV 92, c. 1726.
- Michel-Richard Delalande, grand motet "Nisi Dominus" S42 (1729).
- Jean-Joseph Cassanéa de Mondonville, grand motet "Nisi Dominus aedificavit" (1743).
- Antonio Vivaldi, two settings, RV 608 for strings and solo voice, and RV 803 for strings and choir, discovered among the "Galuppi" sacred works in the Saxon State and University Library Dresden in 2006.

=== In German ===
"Wo Gott zum Haus" is a German metrical and rhyming paraphrase of the psalm by Johann Kolross, set to music by Luther (printed 1597) and by Hans Leo Hassler (c. 1607). Adam Gumpelzhaimer used the first two lines for a canon, Wo Gott zum Haus nicht gibt sein Gunst / So arbeit jedermann umsonst ("Where God to the house does not give his blessing / There toils every man in vain"). Heinrich Schütz composed a metred paraphrase of the psalm, "Wo Gott zum Haus nicht gibt sein Gunst", SWV 232, for the Becker Psalter, published first in 1628; He set Wo der Herr nicht das Haus bauet, SWV 400, in 1650.

=== In English ===
- Florence Margaret Spencer Palmer (1900-1987) motet "Except the Lord Build the House"

== Nisi Dominus Frustra ==
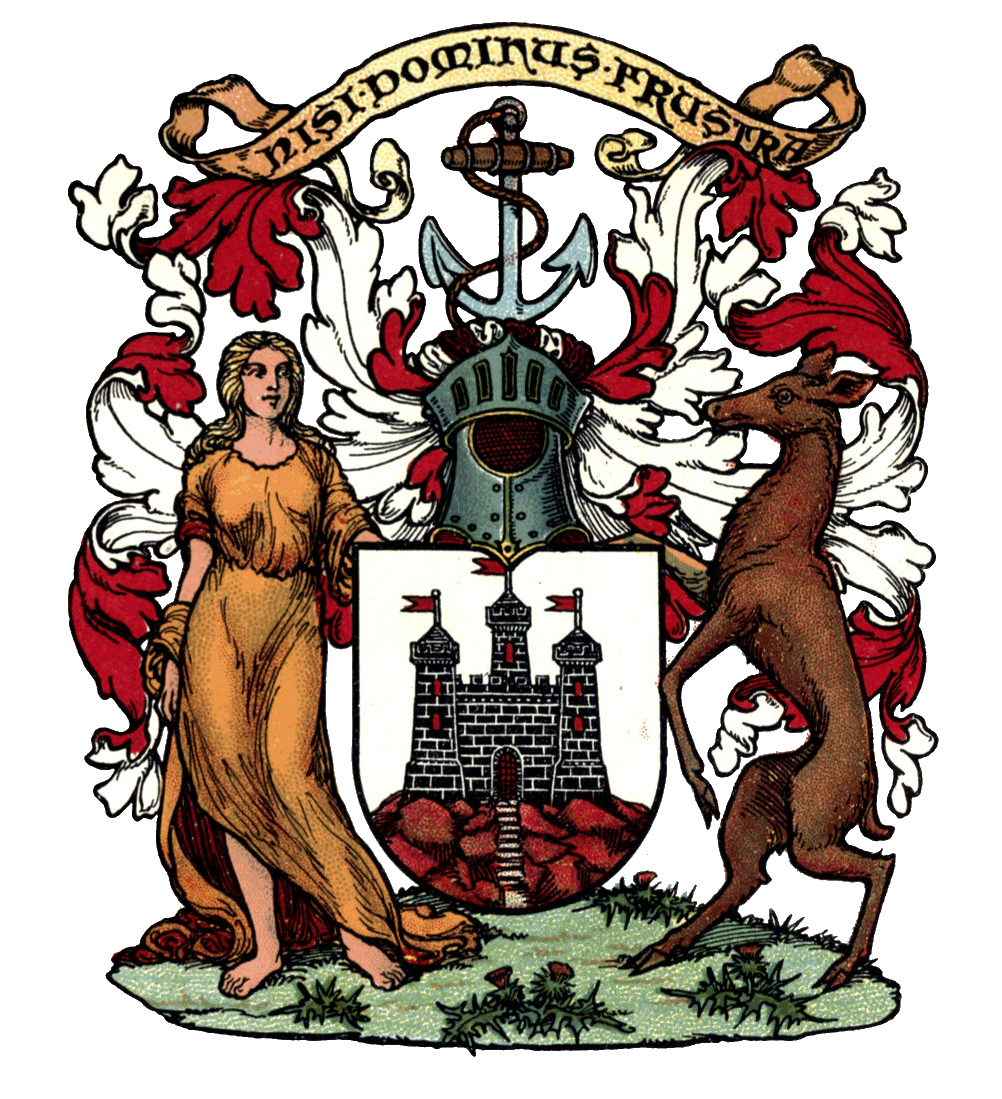
Coat of arms of the City of Edinburgh

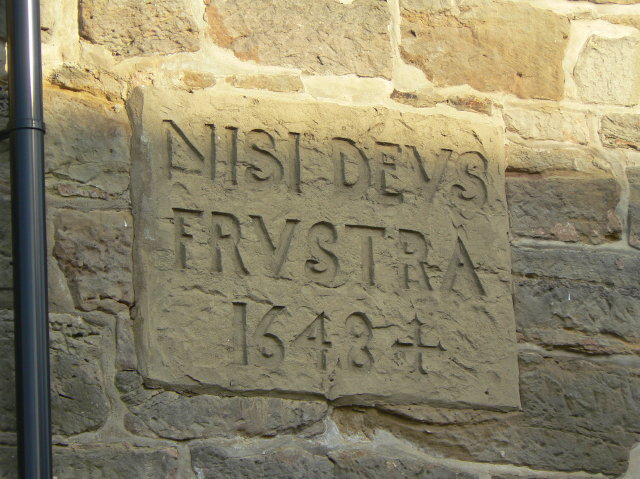
NISI DEVS / FRVSTRA / 1648+, inscription on a house in Castle Donington, Leicestershire

Nisi Dominus Frustra ("Without God, [it is] in vain") is a popular motto derived from the psalm's first verse, as an abbreviation of "Except the Lord build the house, they labour in vain that build it". It is often inscribed on buildings. It has been the motto in the coat of arms of the City of Edinburgh since 1647, and was the motto of the former Metropolitan Borough of Chelsea. It was similarly the motto of the King's Own Scottish Borderers, and the motto of the Inglises of Cramond shared with Bishop Charles Inglis and his descendants.

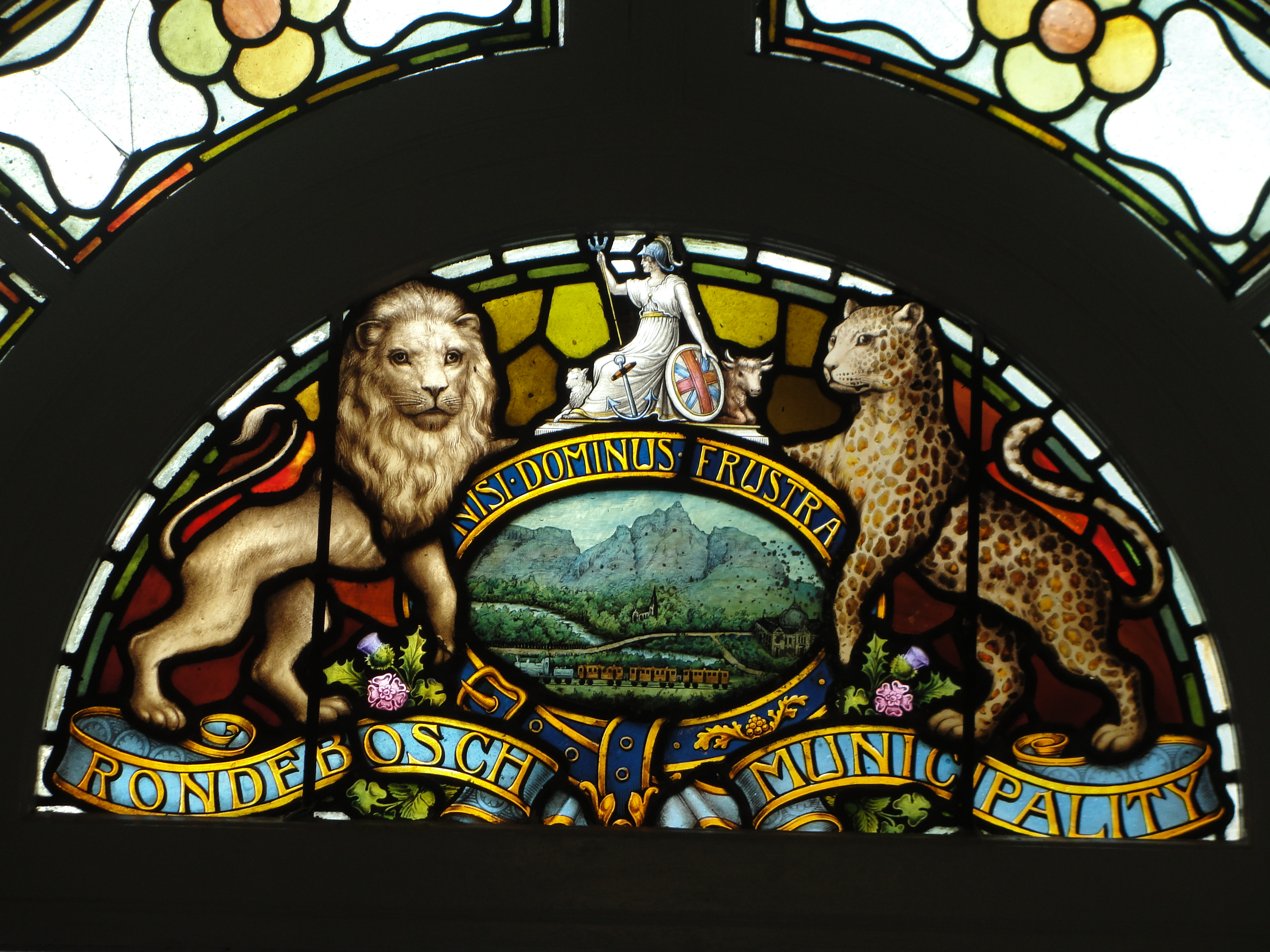
Stained glass window at Rondebosch Town Hall, South Africa. The Latin motto reads "nisi dominus frustra".

It has been adopted as the motto for numerous schools in Great Britain, including King Edward VI High School, Stafford, Melbourn Village College, London, and as the insignia of Glenlola Collegiate School in Northern Ireland. Other schools with this motto are St Joseph's College, Dumfries, Villa Maria Academy (Malvern, Pennsylvania), Rickmansworth School (Nisi Dominus Aedificaverit), The Park School, Yeovil, Bukit Bintang Girls' School, Bukit Bintang Boys' Secondary School, St Thomas School, Kolkata, Kirkbie Kendal School, Richmond College, Galle, Mount Temple Comprehensive School, Dublin, Ireland, Durban Girls' College, Durban, South Africa, and Launceston Church Grammar School, Tasmania, Australia.

The Aquitanian city of Agen takes as its motto the second verse of the psalm, "Nisi dominus custodierit civitatem frustra vigilat qui custodit eam": "Unless the Lord watches over the city, the guards stand watch in vain" (verse 1a, NIV version).

Edinburgh Napier University, established in 1964, has "secularized" the city's motto to "Nisi sapientia frustra" ("without knowledge/wisdom, all is in vain").

== Text ==
The following table shows the Hebrew text of the Psalm with vowels, alongside the Koine Greek text in the Septuagint and the English translation from the King James Version. Note that the meaning can slightly differ between these versions, as the Septuagint and the Masoretic Text come from different textual traditions. (Note: A 1917 translation directly from Hebrew to English by the Jewish Publication Society can be found here or here, and an 1844 translation directly from the Septuagint by L. C. L. Brenton can be found here. Both translations are in the public domain.) In the Septuagint, this psalm is numbered Psalm 126.

| # | Hebrew | English | Greek |
|---|---|---|---|
| 1 | שִׁ֥יר הַֽמַּעֲל֗וֹת לִשְׁלֹ֫מֹ֥ה אִם־יְהֹוָ֤ה ׀ לֹא־יִבְנֶ֬ה בַ֗יִת שָׁ֤וְא עָמְל֣וּ בוֹנָ֣יו בּ֑וֹ אִם־יְהֹוָ֥ה לֹא־יִשְׁמׇר־עִ֝֗יר שָׁ֤וְא ׀ שָׁקַ֬ד שׁוֹ מֵֽר׃ | (A Song of degrees for Solomon.) Except the LORD build the house, they labour in vain that build it: except the LORD keep the city, the watchman waketh but in vain. | ᾿ῼδὴ τῶν ἀναβαθμῶν. - ΕΑΝ μὴ Κύριος οἰκοδομήσῃ οἶκον, εἰς μάτην ἐκοπίασαν οἱ οἰκοδομοῦντες· ἐὰν μὴ Κύριος φυλάξῃ πόλιν, εἰς μάτην ἠγρύπνησεν ὁ φυλάσσων. |
| 2 | שָׁ֤וְא לָכֶ֨ם מַשְׁכִּ֪ימֵֽי ק֡וּם מְאַחֲרֵי־שֶׁ֗בֶת אֹ֭כְלֵי לֶ֣חֶם הָעֲצָבִ֑ים כֵּ֤ן יִתֵּ֖ן לִידִיד֣וֹ שֵׁנָֽא׃ | It is vain for you to rise up early, to sit up late, to eat the bread of sorrows: for so he giveth his beloved sleep. | εἰς μάτην ὑμῖν ἐστι τὸ ὀρθρίζειν, ἐγείρεσθαι μετὰ τὸ καθῆσθαι, οἱ ἐσθίοντες ἄρτον ὀδύνης, ὅταν δῷ τοῖς ἀγαπητοῖς αὐτοῦ ὕπνον. |
| 3 | הִנֵּ֤ה נַחֲלַ֣ת יְהֹוָ֣ה בָּנִ֑ים שָׂ֝כָ֗ר פְּרִ֣י הַבָּֽטֶן׃ | Lo, children are an heritage of the LORD: and the fruit of the womb is his reward. | ἰδοὺ ἡ κληρονομία Κυρίου υἱοί, ὁ μισθὸς τοῦ καρποῦ τῆς γαστρός. |
| 4 | כְּחִצִּ֥ים בְּיַד־גִּבּ֑וֹר כֵּ֝֗ן בְּנֵ֣י הַנְּעוּרִֽים׃ | As arrows are in the hand of a mighty man; so are children of the youth. | ὡσεὶ βέλη ἐν χειρὶ δυνατοῦ, οὕτως οἱ υἱοὶ τῶν ἐκτετιναγμένων. |
| 5 | אַשְׁרֵ֤י הַגֶּ֗בֶר אֲשֶׁ֤ר מִלֵּ֥א אֶת־אַשְׁפָּת֗וֹ מֵ֫הֶ֥ם לֹֽא־יֵבֹ֑שׁוּ כִּֽי־יְדַבְּר֖וּ אֶת־אוֹיְבִ֣ים בַּשָּֽׁעַר׃ | Happy is the man that hath his quiver full of them: they shall not be ashamed, but they shall speak with the enemies in the gate. | μακάριος ὃς πληρώσει τὴν ἐπιθυμίαν αὐτοῦ ἐξ αὐτῶν· οὐ καταισχυνθήσονται, ὅταν λαλῶσι τοῖς ἐχθροῖς αὐτῶν ἐν πύλαις. |

== Sources ==
- Scherman, Rabbi Nosson (2003). The Complete Artscroll Siddur (3rd ed.). Mesorah Publications. ISBN 9780899066509.
