= Giovanni Gallo =

Giovanni Gallo may refer to:

- Giovanni Gallo (choreographer) (fl. 1726 – c. 1749), Italian choreographer
- Giovanni Gallo (politician) (born 1955), Italian politician
- Giovanni Pietro Gallo (fl. 1591 – c. 1600), Italian composer
