= Peter Ryom =

Danish musicologist

Peter Ryom (born 31 May 1937 in Copenhagen) is a Danish musicologist. He is internationally known as the author of the Ryom-Verzeichnis, the now-standard catalogue of the works of Antonio Vivaldi. The number of a composition in the Ryom Verzeichnis (Ryom catalogue) is always prefaced by the abbreviation RV.

== Partial bibliography ==
- Ryom, Peter (1973). Antonio Vivaldi. Table de concordances des œuvres (RV). Kopenhagen: Engstrøm & Sødring. pp. 92 p. illus. 24 cm. ISBN 87-87091-00-3.
- Ryom, Peter (1974). Verzeichnis der Werke Antonio Vivaldis (RV). Kleine Ausgabe. Kopenhagen/Leipzig: Engstrøm & Sødring/Deutscher Verlag für Musik. OCLC 63852775. OCLC: 63852775.
- Ryom, Peter (1974). Verzeichnis der Werke Antonio Vivaldis (RV). Leipzig: Deutscher Verlag f. Musik, VEB. OCLC 3671203. OCLC: 3671203.
- Ryom, Peter (1977). Les manuscrits de Vivaldi. Kopenhagen: Antonio Vivaldi Archives. ISBN 87-87677-00-8. OCLC 3822958.
- Ryom, Peter (1986). Répertoire des œuvres d'Antonio Vivaldi : les compositions instrumentales. Kopenhagen: Engstrøm & Sødring. ISBN 87-87091-19-4. OCLC 14989175.
