= Nisi Dominus (Handel) =

Psalm setting by George Frideric Handel

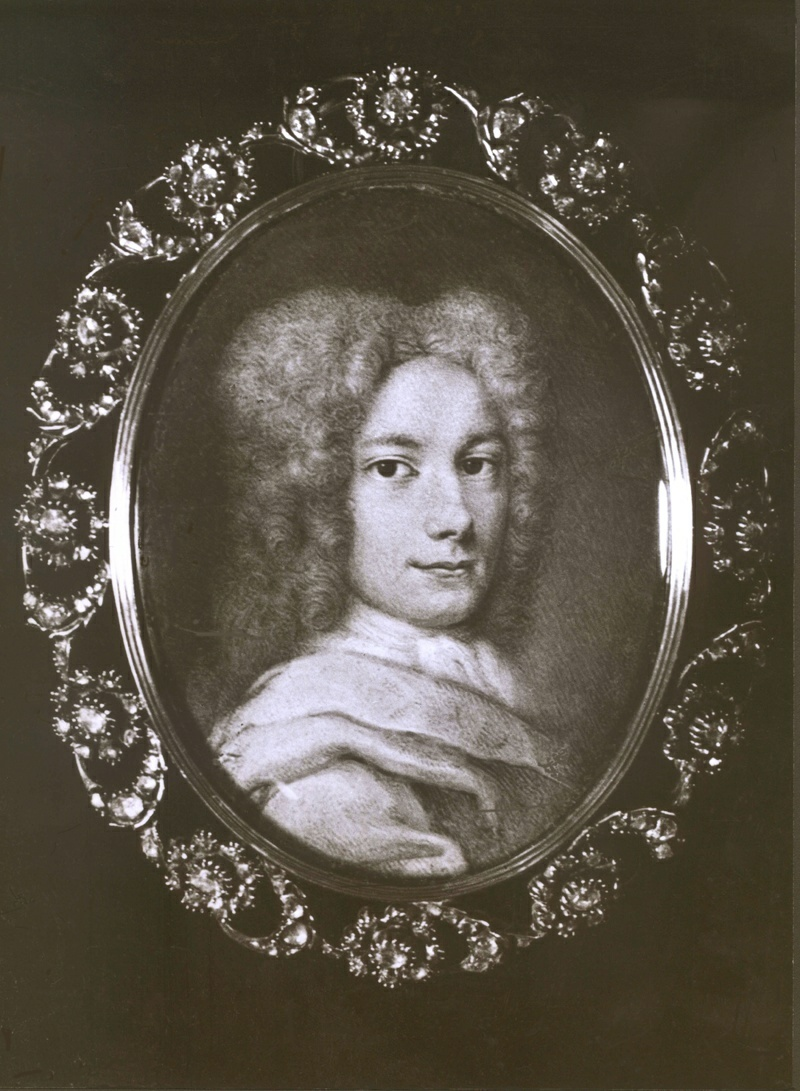
George Friederic Handel c. 1710

Nisi Dominus is a setting of the Latin text of Psalm 127 (Vulgate 126) by George Friederic Handel. The name of the piece comes from the first two words (the incipit) of the psalm, and it is catalogued in the composer's complete works as HWV 238. It was completed by 13 July 1707, and is one of a number of works he composed in Italy. It is most likely that Nisi Dominus was first performed on 16 July 1707 in the church of Santa Maria in Montesanto, Rome, under the patronage of the Colonna family.

In the concluding doxology, Handel writes for eight voices in a double chorus and (uniquely in his output) a double string orchestra.

A typical performance lasts almost 12 minutes.

== Movements ==
The work has the following movements:

	Type and voice	Text	Translation
I	Soloists and Chorus	Nisi Dominus aedificaverit domum, in vanum laboraverunt, qui aedificant eam. Nisi Dominus custodierit civitatem, frustra vigilat, qui custodit eam.	Except the Lord build the house: their labour is but lost that build it Except the Lord keep the city: the watchman waketh but in vain.
II	Aria (Tenor solo)	Vanum est vobis ante lucem surgere: surgite, post quam sederitis, qui manducatis panem doloris.	It is but lost labour that ye haste to rise up early, and so late take rest, and eat the bread of carefulness.
III	Aria (Countertenor solo)	Cum dederit dilectis suis somnum. Ecce haereditas Domini filii, merces fructus ventris.	For so he giveth his beloved sleep. Lo, children and the fruit of the womb: are an heritage and gift that cometh of the Lord.
IV	Aria (Bass solo)	Sicut sagittae in manu potentis ita filii excussorum.	Like as the arrows in the hand of the giant: even so are the young children.
V	Aria (Tenor solo)	Beatus vir qui implevit desiderium suum ex ipsis: non confundetur cum loquetur inimicis suis in porta.	Happy is the man that hath his quiver full of them: they shall not be ashamed when they speak with their enemies in the gate.
VI	Double Chorus	Gloria Patri et Filio, Spiritui Sancto. Sicut erat in principio, et nunc, et semper, et in saecula saeculorum. Amen	Glory be to the Father, and to the Son, and to the Holy Ghost: As it was in the beginning is now, and ever shall be: world without end. Amen.

== See also ==
- List of Latin church music by George Frideric Handel
