= Magnificat (Vivaldi) =

Musical compositions by Antonio Vivaldi

- by Antonio Vivaldi
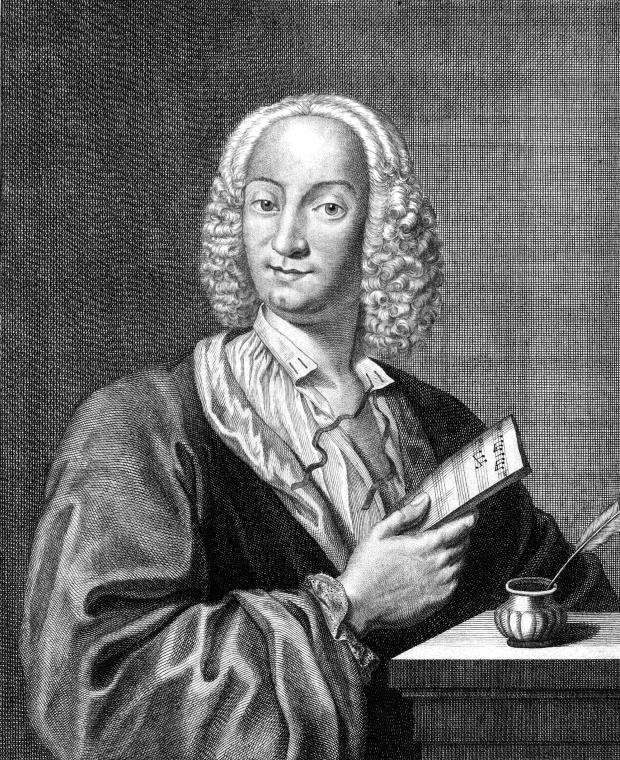
- The composer on a 1725 etching by François Morellon de La Cave
- Key: G minor
- Catalogue: RV 610, 610a, 610b, 611
- Text: Magnificat, Doxology
- Composed: c. 1715, c. 1730, and 1739: Venice

Antonio Vivaldi made several versions of his G minor setting of the Magnificat canticle. He scored his best known version, RV 610, for vocal soloists, four-part choir, oboes and string orchestra, which also exists in a version for two groups of performers (in due cori, RV 610a). He based these versions on an earlier setting for voices and strings only (RV 610b). His ultimate version, in which some choral and ensemble movements are replaced by five arias, to be sung by girls from the Ospedale della Pietà orphanage, was catalogued as RV 611. The concise work is well suited for use in vesper services.

== Versions ==
Versions of Vivaldi's Magnificat in G minor
RV	Scoring	Additional info
610	2s, a, t, SATB, 2ob, str	late 1720s – early 1730s
610a	s, t, SATB, 2ob, str + 2s, a, SATB, str	late 1720s – early 1730s
610b	2s, a, t, b, SATB, str	earliest version (c. 1715)
611	s, a, t, SATB	latest version (1739)

== History ==
Vivaldi worked in Venice as a priest and director of music at an orphanage for girls, Ospedale della Pietà, and left a substantial amount of sacred music.

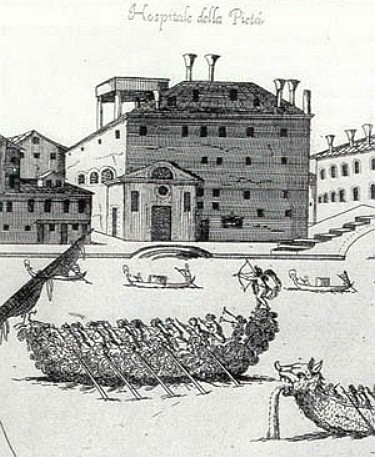
Ospedale della Pietà

He composed settings of the Magnificat canticle, a regular part of vesper services. Musicologists differ in dating the works, for example before 1717 or in 1719. According to the musicologist Michael Talbot, Vivaldi wrote the earliest version in G minor for the orphanage c. 1715, and copied it for a Cistercian monastery of Osek soon afterwards. He revised it in the 1720s, making the tenor and bass parts more suitable to male voices, and adding two oboes, which he used prominently as obbligato instruments in an expanded version of "Sicut locutus est". This version became known as RV 610. While Vivaldi assigned two choirs, with instructions in the choral movements to use one or the other or both, it remains monochoral music. Vivaldi wrote a later setting, RV 611, which retained the choral sections but replaced the three sections for solo voices by five more elaborate arias, in which individual girls from the orphanage could show off their skills. Their names were noted in the score.

== Structure and scoring ==
Vivaldi structured the Magnificat, RV 610, in nine movements, eight for the text of the canticle (Luke 1:46-55) and the conclusion for the doxology. Set in G minor, it is scored for two soprano soloists, alto and tenor soloists, SATB choir, two oboes, violin I and II, viola, and basso continuo, such as cello and a keyboard instrument. The following table shows the title, voices, tempo marking, time, key and text source for the nine movements. A performance requires approximately 15 minutes. A performance of RV 611, with the elaborate arias, takes around 20 minutes.

Movements of Vivaldi's Magnificat, RV 610
	Title	Voices	Tempo	Time	Key	Text source	Audio
1	Magnificat	SATB	Adagio	common time	G minor	Luke 1:46	1
2	Et exultavit	s; a; t	Allegro	common time	B♭ major	Luke 1:47-49	2
3	Et misericordia	SATB	Andante molto	common time	C minor	Luke 1:50	3
4	Fecit potentiam	SATB	Presto	3/4	A major	Luke 1:51	4
5	Deposuit potentes de sede	SATB (unisono)	Allegro	3/4	G minor	Luke 1:52	5
6	Esurientes implevit bonis	s; s	Allegro	common time	B♭ major	Luke 1:53	6
7	Suscepit Israel	SATB	Largo	common time	D minor	Luke 1:54	7
8	Sicut locutus est	SAB	Allegro ma poco	common time	F major	Luke 1:55	8
9	Gloria patri	SATB	Largo	cut time	G minor	Doxology	9

=== Movements ===
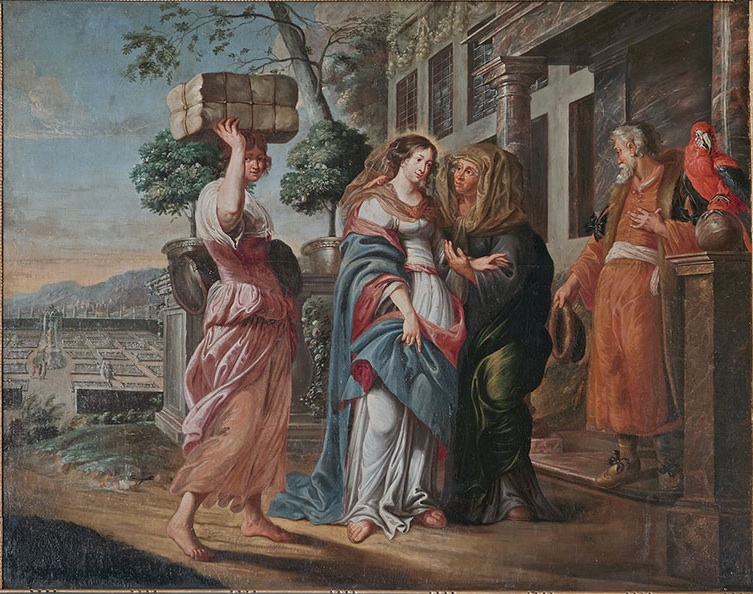
17th-century painting of the Visitation

Vivaldi interpreted each verse of the Magnificat canticle with different musical material but kept the work concise. Michael Talbot characterised the movements in liner notes:

==== 1 ====
1. Magnificat anima mea Dominum

2. Et exultavit spiritus meus

3. Et misericordia ejus

4. Fecit potentiam

5. Deposuit potentes

6. Esurientes implevit bonis

7. Suscepit Israel

8. Sicut locutus est ad patres nostros

9. Gloria Patri

The first movement expresses the magnification, "Magnificat anima mea Dominum" (My soul magnifies the Lord), with a striking upward chromatic passage in slow tempo.

==== 2 ====
In the second movement, three passages of the verse are given to different solo voices in an aria a tre. "Et exultavit spiritus meus" (And my spirit rejoices) is sung by the soprano, "Quia respexit humilitatem" (because he regarded the humility of his servant) by the alto, with a choral entry to illustrate "omnes generationes" (all generations), and the passage "Quia fecit mihi magna" (because he did great things for me) by the tenor.

==== 3 ====
The third movement, "Et misericordia ejus", speaks of the mercy of the Lord for all who fear him. Both mercy and fear are expressed in a dense tecture of imitative music, with chromatic lines and leaps of minor sixths and major sevenths, called "anguished intervals".

==== 4 ====
The fourth movement, "Fecit potentiam" (He exerts power), is a fast, powerful choral movement.

==== 5 ====
The next verse, "Deposuit potentes", describes how the mighty are thrown from their seats while the humble are exalted. Vivaldi expresses it in graphically dramatic unison lines of the choir.

==== 6 ====
In the sixth movement, "Esurientes implevit bonis", a duet of sopranos, often in parallel lines, illustrates how the hungry are filled with good things, on an ostinato figure in the bass line.

==== 7 ====
The seventh movement, "Suscepit Israel", is a short chorale movement saying that the Lord sustains Israel, adding in a faster middle section "Recordatus misericordiae suae" (remembering his mercy).

==== 8 ====
The eighth movement, "Sicut locutus est ad patres nostros" (As He has promised our fathers), is a cheerful trio for three soloists and two obbligato oboes. A reviewer described the lines of oboes and bassoon as "bubbly", in dialogue with "lively transparent vocal lines".

==== 9 ====
The final movement adds the traditional doxology on the biblical text "Gloria Patri" (Glory to the Father). The music recalls the beginning of the first movement, with a long chromatic melisma on "sancto" (holy). "Sicut erat in principio" (As it was in the beginning) is also reminiscent of the first movement but leads to a traditional double fugue treatment of "Et in saecula saeculorum" (and for ever and ever) in one voice and simultaneously "Amen" in another.

== Publications ==
Carus-Verlag published two versions of Vivaldi's Magnificat, RV 610 and RV 611, in 1978. Bärenreiter published an arrangement of both versions for voices and organ in 2004. Ricordi also published the two versions, most recently in a critical version in 2019 by Michael Talbot.

== Selected Recordings ==
In 1964 a version by Carlo Felice Cillario conducting the Angelicum Chamber Orchestra featuring soloists Emilia Cundari, Angela Vercelli, and Anna Maria Rota was released. This recording was released in the United States in 1968 by Musical Heritage Society. In 1994, a recording was made by The King's Consort and Choir, conducted by Robert King. A 2002 recording was performed by the Estonian Philharmonic Chamber Choir with soloists and the Tallinn Chamber Orchestra, conducted by Tonu Kaljuste. In 2015, the work was recorded, along with Vivaldi's Gloria, by Le Concert Spirituel conducted by Herve Niquet. The soprano and alto choir sections perform the solo movements in this performance, which was also presented at the Festival Oude Muziek in Utrecht.
