= Nisi Dominus (Vivaldi) =

Cantata by Vivaldi, Psalm setting for alto and orchestra

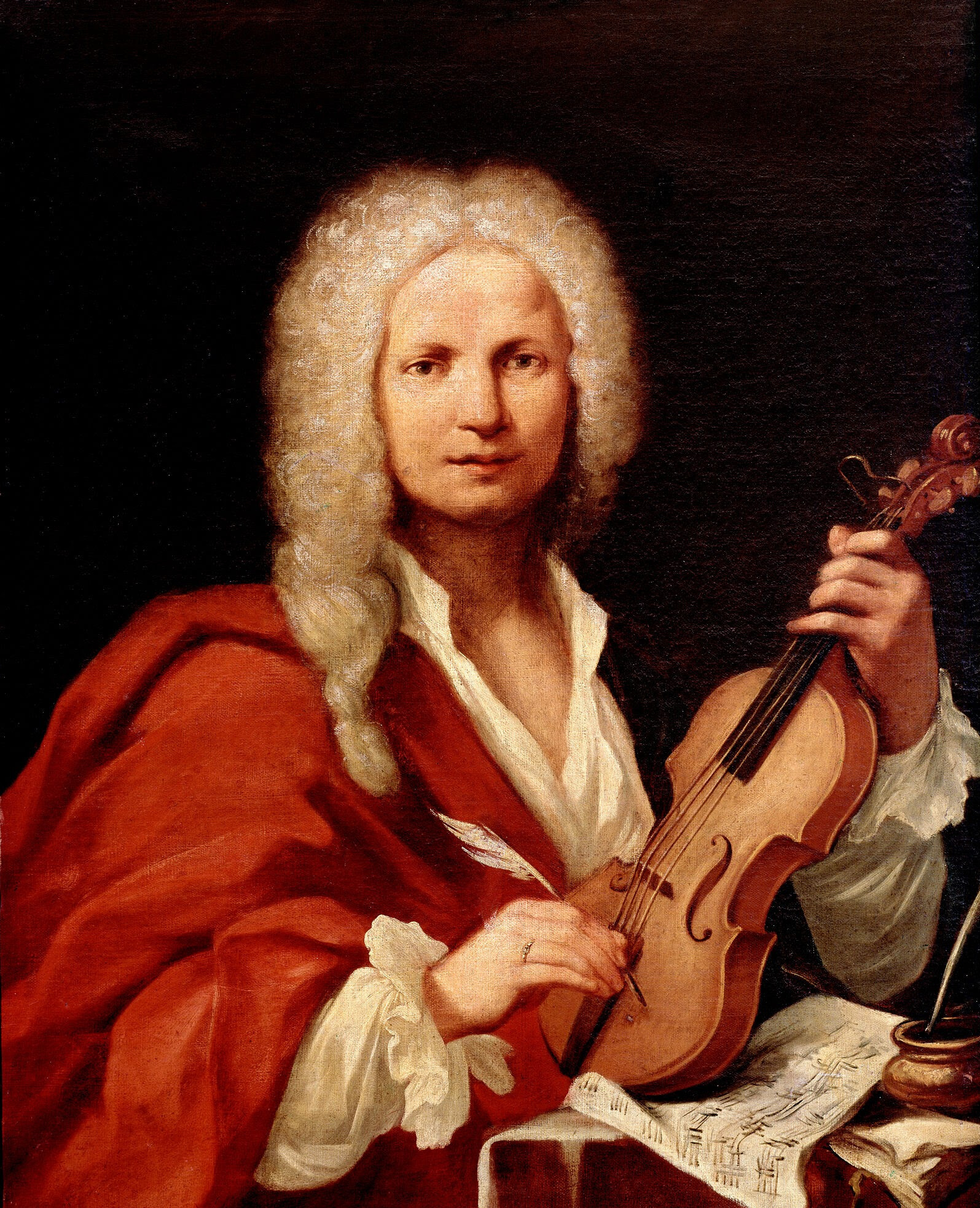
Probable portrait of Antonio Vivaldi, c. 1723

Nisi Dominus, RV 608, is a musical setting by Antonio Vivaldi of Psalm 127 (Vulgate 126), intended for Vespers. His score, written c. 1715, calls for alto voice, strings and organ or harpsichord. The alto part may be taken by (female) contralto or (male) countertenor.

Vivaldi would again set this psalm, but with three voice-parts and orchestral accompaniment (RV 803), in 1739.

== Background ==
Nisi Dominus RV 608 is unusual in that it sets a Vesper Psalm for a solo voice. It was composed between 1713 and 1717 during Vivaldi's engagement at the girls' orphanage Ospedale della Pietà in Venice, where it was probably first performed.

RV 608 has been described by musicologists as a remarkable work in a number of ways. Harriet Smith wrote, "what's extraordinary is the composer's sheer imagination in terms of colour and mood". James Manheim writes, "It is the variety of instrumental accompaniments, as vivid as those of any Baroque opera, that brings the work to life." Bruce Lamott says:

Vivaldi's integration of the text and characteristic musical devices is impressive. A concerto-like ritornello opens the work with industrious rhythms and precipitous leaps appropriate to "Unless the Lord build the house". The second and third movements contrast the hesitant futility of rising before dawn [words to live by, in my opinion] with the frenetic scales of "Rise after you have rested". "The bread of sorrow" (doloris) is word-painted with a bass descending by half-steps, a typical figure for operatic laments. And "Cum dederit" is a gently rocking siciliana, a common operatic conceit for sleep arias.

James Manheim summarizes by saying that this work "supports the conclusion that the relative obscurity of Vivaldi's vocal music is due more to historical accident than to any lack of quality."

== Structure ==
The above-mentioned scoring holds for all nine movements:

Movement	Text	Translation
1	Nisi Dominus aedificaverit domum, in vanum laboraverunt, qui aedificant eam. Nisi Dominus custodierit civitatem, frustra vigilat, qui custodit eam.	Unless the Lord builds the house, they labour in vain who build it; Unless the Lord guards the city, the watchman stays awake in vain.
2 + 3	Vanum est vobis ante lucem surgere: surgite, post quam sederitis, qui manducatis panem doloris.	It is vain for you to rise up early, to sit up late, to eat the bread of sorrows;
4	Cum dederit dilectis suis somnum. Ecce haereditas Domini filii, merces fructus ventris.	For so he gives his beloved sleep. Behold, children are a heritage from the Lord, The fruit of the womb is a reward.
5	Sicut sagittae in manu potentis ita filii excussorum.	Like arrows in the hand of a warrior, so are the children of one's youth.
6	Beatus vir qui implevit desiderium suum ex ipsis: non confundetur cum loquetur inimicis suis in porta.	Happy is the man that has his quiver full of them; but they shall not be ashamed, but shall speak with their enemies in the gate.
7	Gloria Patri, et Filio, et Spiritui Sancto.	Glory be to the Father, and to the Son, and to the Holy Ghost.
8	Sicut erat in principio, et nunc, et semper, et in saecula saeculorum.	As it was in the beginning, is now, and ever shall be, world without end.
9	Amen.	Amen.

The work is unusual in that it splits the doxology into two separate movements (7 + 8), and even more striking is its treatment of the first of those, the Gloria Patri. Bruce Lamott says "In what Vivaldi scholar Michael Talbot calls a coup de théâtre, Vivaldi saves the greatest surprises for the Gloria Patri." Normally, the entire doxology is a single movement, a cheerful celebratory movement serving as the climax of a piece. Instead, Vivaldi set the words of the ""Gloria Patri" to slow mournful music, using "the unusual colouring of a viola d'amore, an instrument on which the composer excelled." Michael Talbot writes that Vivaldi's musical setting of the "Gloria Patri" turns this part of the doxology into "a journey through a vale of tears: praise of the Trinity despite everything, rather than on account of everything."

With the second half of the doxology, "Sicut erat" (As it was in the beginning), Vivaldi creates a musical pun by reprising the music of the opening movement. This movement and the final "Amen" are more upbeat and celebratory, typical for concluding movements of such pieces.
