= Giovanni Gallo (choreographer) =

Giovanni Gallo (fl. 1726 – c. 1749) was an 18th-century Italian choreographer. He created the choreography to more than thirty ballets staged on Venice from 1726 through 1749. These ballets were all contained inside operas. He mainly worked in two opera houses, the Teatro San Angelo and the Teatro San Giovanni Grisostomo, but also occasionally worked at the Teatro San Samuele, the Teatro San Moisè, and the Teatro San Cassiano. Composers whose operas he choreographed ballets in included Tomaso Albinoni, Giovanni Maria Ruggieri, Antonio Vivaldi, and Johann Adolf Hasse. He had a school of music and dance in San Giovanni Grisostomo, Venice.
