= Giovanni Maria Ruggieri =

Italian composer

Giovanni Maria Ruggieri or Ruggeri was a Baroque composer from Italy. His dates of birth and death are uncertain, but he may have been born about 1665 in Verona and died around 1725. He is known to have flourished from 1689–1720.

== Life ==
His major works were apparently composed in Venice. His first work, La Clotilde, is extant, and on its title page he described himself as an amateur; the librettist for the same work described him as being distinguished among amateurs and the peer of the most celebrated scholars of music. Other than these fragments, very little is known about his personal life. Archives in the Museo Correr in Venice indicate that he owned several properties and he may have been in the service of the noble Contarini family, to whom he wrote a letter in 1695. His early musical career comprises four collections of trio sonatas, both da camera and da chiesa, published at some time between 1689 and 1697, but these have since been lost. His surviving sonatas display considerable invention and ability with counterpoint. In 1696 Ruggieri began working full-time as a composer and presumably encountered considerable success, because his operas were often revived: Armida abbandonata was produced at least five times between 1707 and 1715. His Elisa (1711) was regarded by critics as a success, and it was the first ever opera buffa to be produced in the Republic of Venice. As a composer of sacred music, he is an important influence on Vivaldi, who would later borrow extensively from Ruggieri's Gloria in D for his own two Glorias. Vivaldi is also said to have revised a work by Ruggieri (L'inganno trionfante in amore); this may well be, but there is no documentary proof of it.

== Work ==
Operas

- Drammi per musica in three acts, first performed in Venice, unless otherwise stated:
- La Clotilde (libretto by Neri), given at San Cassiano during carnival, 1696; revived as Amar per vendetta at San Moisè in November 1702;
- La Mariamme (libretto by Burlini), first performed at Santi Giovanni e Paolo in autumn 1696, only a few arias remain;
- La saggia pazzia di Giunio Bruto (libretto by Lotti), première at Santi Giovanni e Paolo on 26 November 1698;
- Milziade (libretto by Lotti), Santi Giovanni e Paolo, carnival 1699, only a few arias remain;
- Armida abbandonata (libretto by Silvani, after Tasso), given at Sant'Angelo, 10 November 1707;
- Arrenione (libretto by Silvani), given at Sant'Angelo at some time during the week before 10 November 1708. May involve work by other composers;
- Arato in Sparta (libretto by Minato), Sant'Angelo, week before 11 January 1710;
- L’ingannator ingannato (libretto by Marchi), San Samuele, autumn 1710;
- Le gare di politica e d’amore (libretto by Salvi), San Samuele, week before 31 January 1711;
- Elisa (a comedy, lyrics by Lalli), given at Sant'Angelo in autumn 1711;
- Arsinoe vendicata (libretto by Braccioli), Sant'Angelo, carnival 1712;

Sacred and vocal

- Twelve cantatas op.5, 1706;
- Laudate Dominum, motet, 8 verses, date illegible;
- Jesu dulcis memoria, Rome, 1689;
- Gloria for soli et chorus

Instrumental (All published in Venice)

- Bizzarie armoniche esposte in dieci suonate da camera a due for violin, lute/theorbo, viola/harpsichord op.1 (1689);
- Scherzi geniali ridotti a regola armonica in dieci suonate da camera a tre op.2, 1690 (lost);
- Suonate da chiesa for two violins, viola/theorbo, organ op.3, 1693;
- Suonate da chiesa for two violins, violoncello, and organ op.4, 1697
