= Antonio Vivaldi =

Italian composer and violinist (1678–1741)

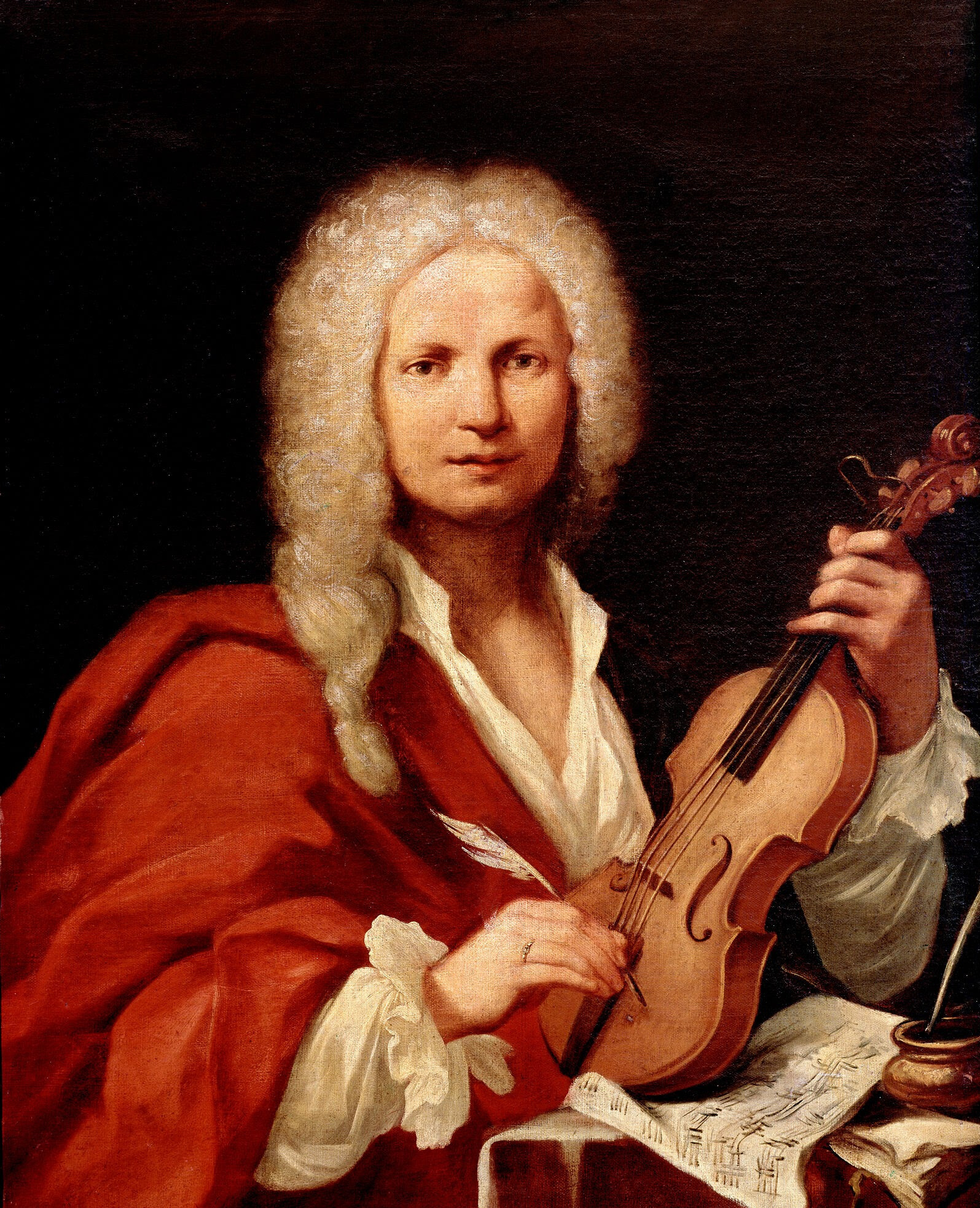
- Putative portrait of Vivaldi, c. 1723 (Note: According to Talbot 2011, p. 148: "An anonymous portrait in oils in the Museo Internazionale e Biblioteca della Musica di Bologna is generally believed to be of Vivaldi and may be linked to the Morellon La Cave engraving, which appears to be a modified mirror reflection of it.")
- Born: 4 March 1678; Venice
- Died: 28 July 1741 (aged 63); Vienna
- Occupations: Composer; violinist; impresario
- Era: Baroque
- Works: Various compositions, especially operas

Antonio Lucio Vivaldi (Note: English: UK: /vɪˈvældi/ viv-AL-dee, US: /vɪˈvɑːldi, -ˈvɔːl-/ viv-AHL-dee, viv-AWL-dee; Italian: [anˈtɔːnjo ˈluːtʃo viˈvaldi]; Venetian: Antonio Łucio Vivaldi [aŋˈtɔnjo ˈɰutʃo viˈvaldi].) (4 March 1678 – 28 July 1741) was an Italian composer, virtuoso violinist, and impresario of Baroque music. Regarded as one of the greatest Baroque composers, Vivaldi was influential across Europe during his lifetime, giving origin to many imitators and admirers. He pioneered many developments in orchestration, violin technique and programmatic music. He consolidated the emerging concerto form, especially the solo concerto, into a widely accepted and followed idiom.

Vivaldi composed many instrumental concertos, for the violin and a variety of other musical instruments, as well as sacred choral works and more than fifty operas. His best-known work is a series of violin concertos known as The Four Seasons. Many of his compositions were written for the all-female music ensemble of the Ospedale della Pietà, a home for abandoned children in his native Venice.

Vivaldi began studying for the Catholic priesthood at the age of 15 and was ordained at 25, but was given dispensation to no longer say public Masses because of a health problem. Vivaldi also had some success with expensive stagings of his operas in Venice, Mantua, and Vienna. After meeting the Emperor Charles VI, he moved to Vienna, hoping for royal support, but the emperor died soon after his arrival, and Vivaldi died in poverty less than a year later.

After almost two centuries of decline, Vivaldi's musical reputation underwent a revival in the early 20th century, with much scholarly research devoted to his work. Many of his compositions, once thought lost, have been rediscovered – some as recently as 2015. His music remains widely popular in the present day and is regularly played all over the world.

== Early life ==
=== Birth and background ===
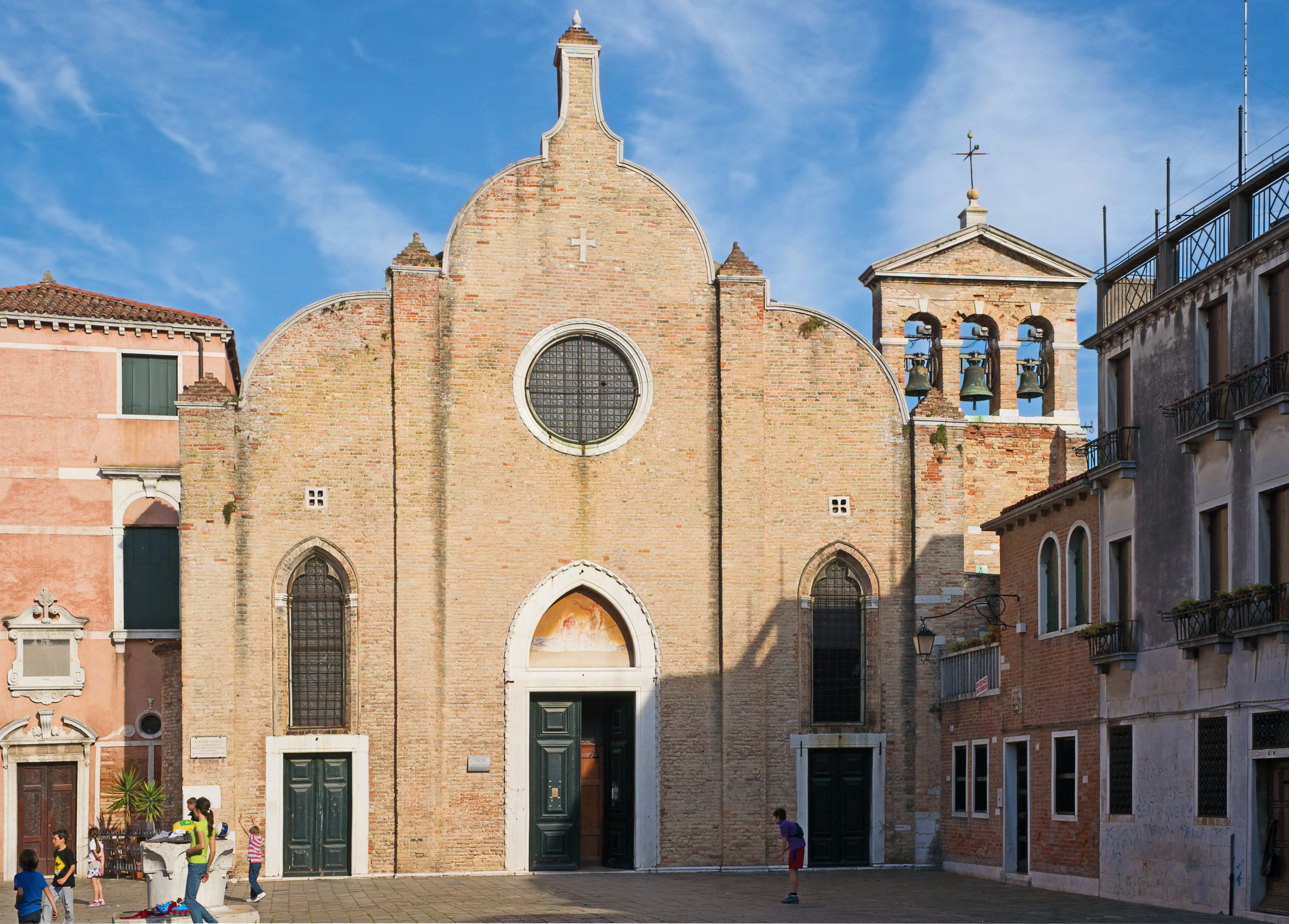
The church where Vivaldi was given the supplemental baptismal rites, San Giovanni in Bragora, Sestiere di Castello, Venice

Antonio Vivaldi was born on 4 March 1678 in Venice, then the capital of the Republic of Venice. He was the son of Giovanni Battista Vivaldi and Camilla Calicchio, as recorded in the register of San Giovanni in Bragora.

He was baptized immediately after his birth at his home by the midwife, which has provoked speculation about the reason. Most likely, it was done because of poor health. There is a false rumor that an earthquake struck the city that day. This rumor may have originated from an earthquake that struck Venice on 17 April 1688. The baptismal ceremonies that had been omitted were supplied two months later.

Vivaldi had five known siblings: Bonaventura Tomaso, Margarita Gabriela, Cecilia Maria, Francesco Gaetano, and Zanetta Anna. Vivaldi's health was problematic. One of his symptoms, strettezza di petto ("tightness of the chest"), has been interpreted as a form of asthma. This did not prevent him from learning to play the violin, composing, or taking part in musical activities, although it prevented him from playing wind instruments.

=== Youth ===
His father, Giovanni Battista, was a barber before becoming a professional violinist and was one of the founders of the Sovvegno dei musicisti di Santa Cecilia, an association of musicians. He taught Antonio to play the violin and then took him on tour around Venice, playing the violin with him. Antonio was probably taught at an early age, judging by the extensive musical knowledge he had acquired by the age of 24, when he started working at the Ospedale della Pietà (Devout Hospital of Mercy), an orphanage in Venice.

The president of the sovvegno was Giovanni Legrenzi, an early Baroque composer and the maestro di cappella at St Mark's Basilica. It is possible that Legrenzi gave the young Antonio his first lessons in composition. Vivaldi's father might have also been a composer: in 1689, an opera titled La Fedeltà sfortunata was composed by a Giovanni Battista Rossi—the name under which Vivaldi's father had joined the Sovvegno di Santa Cecilia.

In 1693, at the age of fifteen, he began studying to become a priest. He was ordained in 1703, aged 25, and was soon nicknamed il Prete Rosso, "The Red Priest"; Rosso is Italian for "red" and would have referred to the color of his hair, a family trait. (Note: In 1704, a year after his ordination, he was given a dispensation from celebrating Mass, most likely because of his ill health. Vivaldi said Mass as a priest only a few times, and appeared to have withdrawn from liturgical duties, though he remained a member of the priesthood. It is thought that this is also due to his habit of composing while celebrating Mass. That he remained committed to his vocation is suggested by the entry in the Vienna death records for him that reads, "Antonio Vivaldi, Secular Priest".)

== Career ==
=== Ospedale della Pietà ===
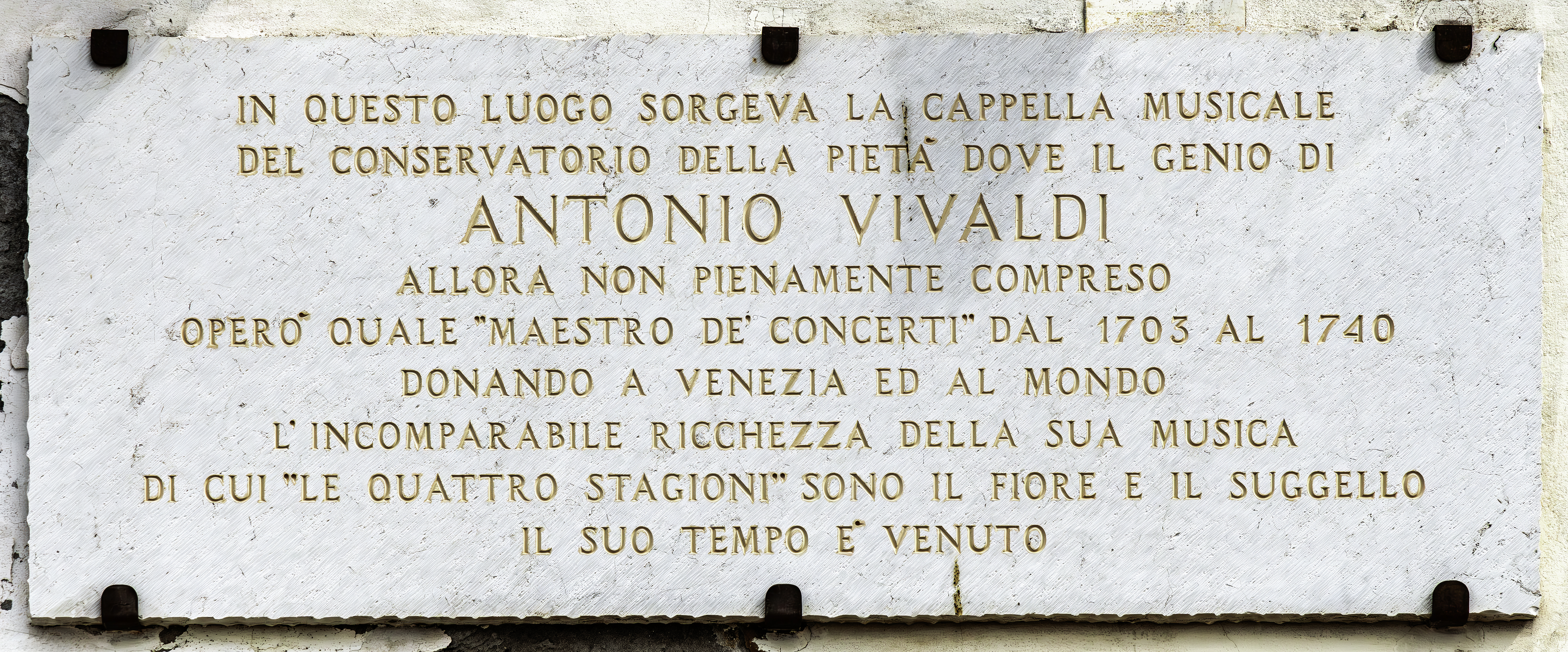
Commemorative plaque beside the Ospedale della Pietà

Although Vivaldi is most famous as a composer, he was regarded as an exceptional technical violinist as well. The German architect Johann Friedrich Armand von Uffenbach referred to Vivaldi as "the famous composer and violinist", and noted in his diary: "Vivaldi played a solo accompaniment excellently, and at the conclusion he added a free fantasy [an improvised cadenza] which absolutely astounded me, for it is hardly possible that anyone has ever played, nor ever will play, in such a fashion." In September 1703, Vivaldi (25) became maestro di violino (master of violin) at the Ospedale della Pietà; although his talents as a violinist probably secured him the job, he soon became a successful teacher of music there.

Giuseppe Nogari, Putative portrait of Antonio Vivaldi, oil on canvas identified by Federico Maria Sardelli in 2026, first half of the 18th century, Marano, private collection of Francesco Molinari Pradelli.

Over the next thirty years he composed most of his major works while working at the Ospedale. There were four similar institutions in Venice; their purpose was to give shelter and education to children who were abandoned or orphaned, or whose families could not support them. They were financed by funds provided by the Republic. The boys learned a trade and had to leave when they reached the age of fifteen. The girls received a musical education, and the most talented among them stayed and became members of the Ospedale's renowned orchestra and choir.

Shortly after Vivaldi's appointment, the orphans began to gain appreciation and esteem abroad, too. Vivaldi wrote concertos, cantatas and sacred vocal music for them. These sacred works, which number over 60, are varied: they included solo motets and large-scale choral works for soloists, double chorus, and orchestra. In 1704, the position of teacher of viola all'inglese was added to his duties as violin instructor. The position of maestro di coro, which was at one time filled by Vivaldi, required a lot of time and work. He had to compose an oratorio or concerto for every feast, and also both teach the orphans music theory, and how to play certain instruments.

His relationship with the board of directors of the Ospedale was often strained. The board had to vote every year on whether to keep a teacher. The vote on Vivaldi was seldom unanimous and went 7 to 6 against him in 1709. In 1711, after a year as a freelance musician, he was recalled by the Ospedale with a unanimous vote; clearly during his year's absence the board had realized the importance of his role. He became responsible for all of the musical activity of the institution when he was promoted to maestro de' concerti (music director) in 1716 and responsible for composing two new concertos every month.

In 1705, the first collection of his works was published by Giuseppe Sala. His Opus 1 is a collection of 12 sonatas for two violins and basso continuo, in a conventional style. In 1709, a second collection of 12 sonatas for violin and basso continuo appeared (Opus 2). A real breakthrough as a composer came with his first collection of 12 concerti for one, two, and four violins with strings, L'estro armonico (Opus 3), which was published in Amsterdam in 1711 by Estienne Roger, and dedicated to Grand Prince Ferdinand of Tuscany. The prince sponsored many musicians, including Alessandro Scarlatti and George Frideric Handel. He was a musician himself, and Vivaldi probably met him in Venice. L'estro armonico was a resounding success all over Europe. It was followed in 1714 by La stravaganza (Opus 4), a collection of concerti for solo violin and strings, and dedicated to an old violin student of Vivaldi's, the Venetian noble Vettor Dolfin.

In February 1711, Vivaldi and his father traveled to Brescia, where his setting of the Stabat Mater (RV 621) was played as part of a religious festival. The work seems to have been written in haste: the string parts are simple, the music of the first three movements is repeated in the next three, and not all the text is set. Nevertheless, perhaps in part because of the forced essentiality of the music, the work is considered to be one of his early masterpieces. Despite his frequent travels from 1718, the Ospedale paid him 2 sequins to write two concerti a month for the orchestra and to rehearse with them at least five times when in Venice. The orphanage's records show that he was paid for 140 concerti between 1723 and 1733.

=== Opera impresario ===
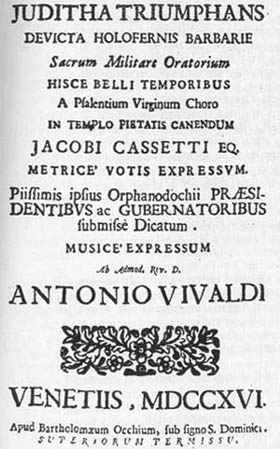
First edition of Juditha triumphans

In early 18th-century Venice, opera was the most popular musical entertainment. It proved most profitable for Vivaldi. There were several theaters competing for the public's attention. Vivaldi started his career as an opera composer as a sideline: his first opera, Ottone in villa (RV 729) was performed not in Venice, but at the Garzerie Theater in Vicenza in 1713. The following year, Vivaldi became the impresario of the Teatro San Angelo in Venice, where his opera Orlando finto pazzo (RV 727) was performed. The work was not to the public's taste, and it closed after a couple of weeks, being replaced with a repeat of a different work already given the previous year.

In 1715, he presented Nerone fatto Cesare (RV 724, now lost), with music by seven different composers, of which he was the leader. The opera contained eleven arias and was a success. In the late season, Vivaldi planned to put on an opera entirely of his own creation, Arsilda, regina di Ponto (RV 700), but the state censor blocked the performance. The main character, Arsilda, falls in love with another woman, Lisea, who is pretending to be a man. Vivaldi got the censor to accept the opera the following year, and it was a resounding success.

During this period, the Pietà commissioned several liturgical works. The most important were two oratorios. Moyses Deus Pharaonis, (RV 643) is now lost. The second, Juditha triumphans (RV 644), celebrates the victory of the Republic of Venice against the Turks and the recapture of the island of Corfu. Composed in 1716, it is one of his sacred masterpieces. All eleven singing parts were performed by girls of the orphanage, both the female and male roles. Many of the arias include parts for solo instruments—recorders, oboes, violas d'amore, and mandolins—that showcased the range of talents of the girls.

Also in 1716, Vivaldi wrote and produced two more operas, L'incoronazione di Dario (RV 719) and La costanza trionfante degli amori e degli odi (RV 706). The latter was so popular that it was performed two years later, re-edited and retitled Artabano re dei Parti (RV 701, now lost). It was also performed in Prague in 1732. In the years that followed, Vivaldi wrote several operas that were performed all over Italy.

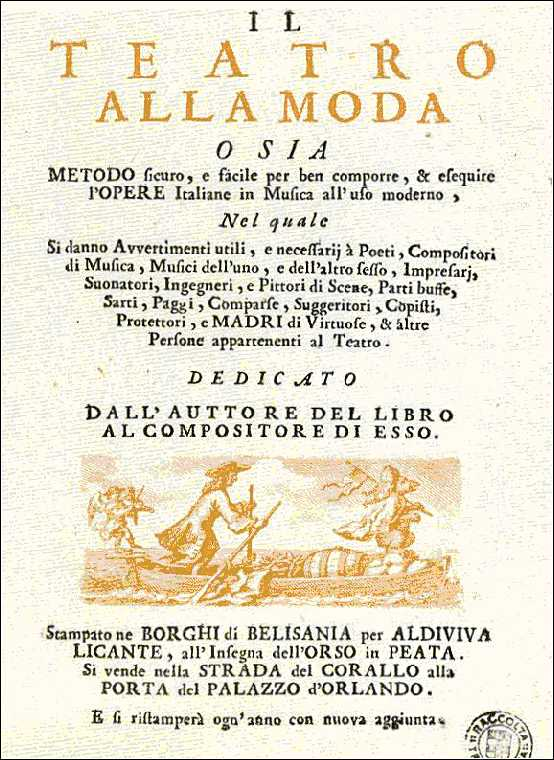
Frontispiece of Il teatro alla moda

His progressive operatic style caused him some trouble with more conservative musicians such as Benedetto Marcello, a magistrate and amateur musician who wrote a pamphlet denouncing Vivaldi and his operas. The pamphlet, Il teatro alla moda, attacks the composer even though it does not mention him directly. The cover drawing shows a boat (the San Angelo), on the left end of which stands a little angel wearing a priest's hat and playing the violin. The Marcello family claimed ownership of the Teatro San Angelo, and a long legal battle had been fought with the management for its restitution, without success. The obscure text under the engraving mentions non-existent places and names: for example, ALDIVIVA is an anagram of "A. Vivaldi".

In a letter written by Vivaldi to his patron Marchese Bentivoglio in 1737, he makes reference to his "94 operas". Only about 50 operas by Vivaldi have been discovered, and no other documentation of the remaining operas exists. Although Vivaldi could have been exaggerating, it is plausible that, in his dual role of composer and impresario, he might have either written or been responsible for the production of as many as 94 operas—given that his career had by then spanned almost 25 years. Although Vivaldi certainly composed many operas in his time, he never attained the prominence of other great composers such as George Frederic Handel, Alessandro Scarlatti, Johann Adolph Hasse, Leonardo Leo, and Baldassare Galuppi, as evidenced by his inability to keep a production running for an extended period of time in any major opera house.

=== Mantua and the Four Seasons ===
In 1717 or 1718, Vivaldi was offered a prestigious new position as Maestro di Cappella of the court of Prince Philip of Hesse-Darmstadt, governor of Mantua, in the northwest of Italy He moved there for three years and produced several operas, among them Tito Manlio (RV 738). In 1721, he was in Milan, where he presented the pastoral drama La Silvia (RV 734); nine arias from it survive. He visited Milan again the following year with the oratorio L'adorazione delli tre re magi al bambino Gesù (RV 645, now lost). In 1722 he moved to Rome, where he introduced his operas' new style. The new Pope Benedict XIII invited Vivaldi to play for him. In 1725, Vivaldi returned to Venice, where he produced four operas in the same year.

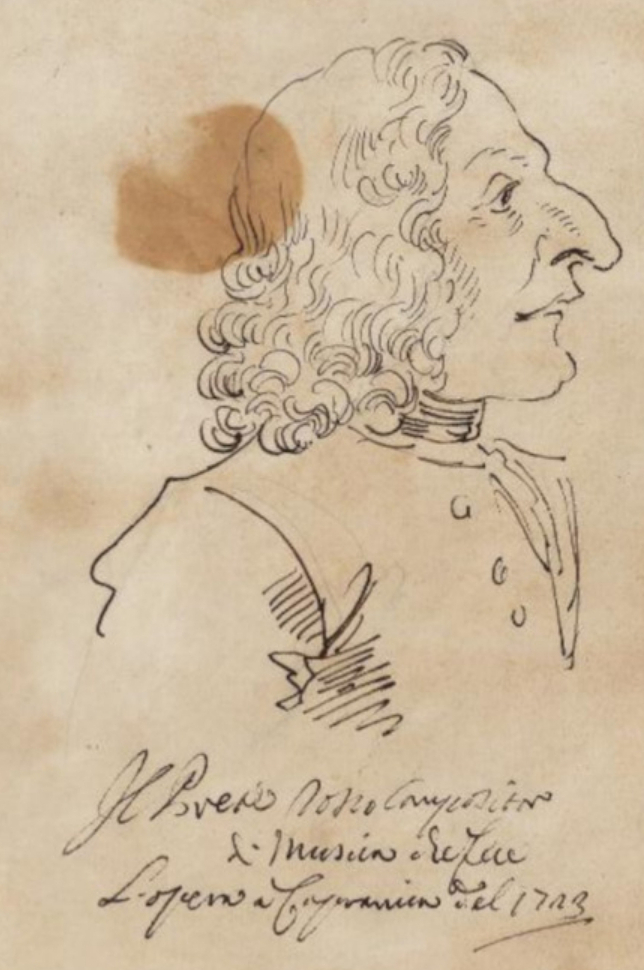
Caricature of Vivaldi by Pier Leone Ghezzi, Rome (1723) (Note: There are only three known surviving depictions of Vivaldi made in his lifetime: this caricature, a woodcut by la Cave, and an anonymous oil portrait of the composer and his violin. Grove's Dictionary of Music and Musicians has disputed the authenticity of the last portrait.)

During this period, Vivaldi wrote the Four Seasons, four violin concertos that give musical expression to the seasons of the year. The composition is one of his most famous. Although three of the concerti are wholly original, the first, "Spring", borrows motifs from a Sinfonia in the first act of Vivaldi's contemporaneous opera Il Giustino. The inspiration for the concertos was probably the countryside around Mantua. They were a revolution in musical conception: in them, Vivaldi represented flowing streams, singing birds (of different species, each specifically characterized), barking dogs, buzzing mosquitoes, crying shepherds, storms, drunken dancers, silent nights, hunting parties from both the hunters' and the prey's point of view, frozen landscapes, ice-skating children, and warming winter fires. Each concerto is associated with a sonnet, possibly by Vivaldi, describing the scenes depicted in the music. They were published as the first four concertos in a collection of twelve, Il cimento dell'armonia e dell'inventione, Opus 8, published in Amsterdam by Michel-Charles Le Cène in 1725.

During his time in Mantua, Vivaldi became acquainted with an aspiring young singer Anna Tessieri Girò, who would become his student, protégée, and favorite prima donna. Anna, along with her older half-sister Paolina, moved in with Vivaldi and regularly accompanied him on his many travels. There was speculation as to the nature of Vivaldi's and Girò's relationship, but no evidence exists to indicate anything beyond friendship and professional collaboration. Vivaldi, in fact, adamantly denied any romantic relationship with Girò in a letter to his patron Bentivoglio, dated 16 November 1737.

=== Late period ===
Vivaldi collaborated with choreographer Giovanni Gallo on several of his later operas stage in Venice with Gallo choreographing the ballets found within those works. At the height of his career, he received commissions from European nobility and royalty, some of which were:

- The serenata (cantata) Gloria e Imeneo (RV 687), which was commissioned in 1725 by the French ambassador to Venice in celebration of the marriage of Louis XV, when Vivaldi was 48 years old.
- The serenata, La Sena festeggiante (RV 694), written in 1726 and also premiered at the French embassy, to celebrate the birth of the French royal princesses, Henriette and Louise Élisabeth.
- Vivaldi's Opus 9, La cetra, was dedicated to Emperor Charles VI. In 1728, Vivaldi met the emperor while the emperor was visiting Trieste to oversee the construction of a new port. Charles VI admired the music of the Red Priest so much that he is said to have spoken more with the composer during their one meeting than he spoke to his ministers in more than two years. He gave Vivaldi the title of knight, a gold medal and an invitation to Vienna. Vivaldi gave Charles a manuscript copy of La cetra, a set of concerti almost completely different from the set of the same title published as Opus 9. The printing was probably delayed, forcing Vivaldi to gather an improvised collection for the emperor.
- His opera Farnace (RV 711) was presented in 1730; (Note: Vivaldi's connections with musical life in Prague and his association with Antonio Denzio, the impresario of the Sporck theater in Prague are detailed in Daniel E. Freeman, The Opera Theater of Count Franz Anton von Sporck in Prague (Stuyvesant, N.Y.: Pendragon Press, 1992).) it garnered six revivals. Some of his later operas were created in collaboration with two of Italy's major writers of the time. Accompanied by his father, Vivaldi traveled to Vienna and Prague in 1730.
- L'Olimpiade and Catone in Utica were written by Pietro Metastasio, the major representative of the Arcadian movement and court poet in Vienna. La Griselda was rewritten by the young Carlo Goldoni from an earlier libretto by Apostolo Zeno.

Like many composers of the time, Vivaldi faced financial difficulties in his later years. His compositions were no longer held in such high esteem as they had once been in Venice; changing musical tastes quickly made them outmoded. In response, Vivaldi chose to sell off sizeable numbers of his manuscripts at paltry prices to finance his migration to Vienna. The reasons for Vivaldi's departure from Venice are unclear, but it seems likely that, after the success of his meeting with Emperor Charles VI, he wished to take up the position of a composer in the imperial court. On his way to Vienna, Vivaldi might have stopped in Graz to see Anna Girò.

== Death ==
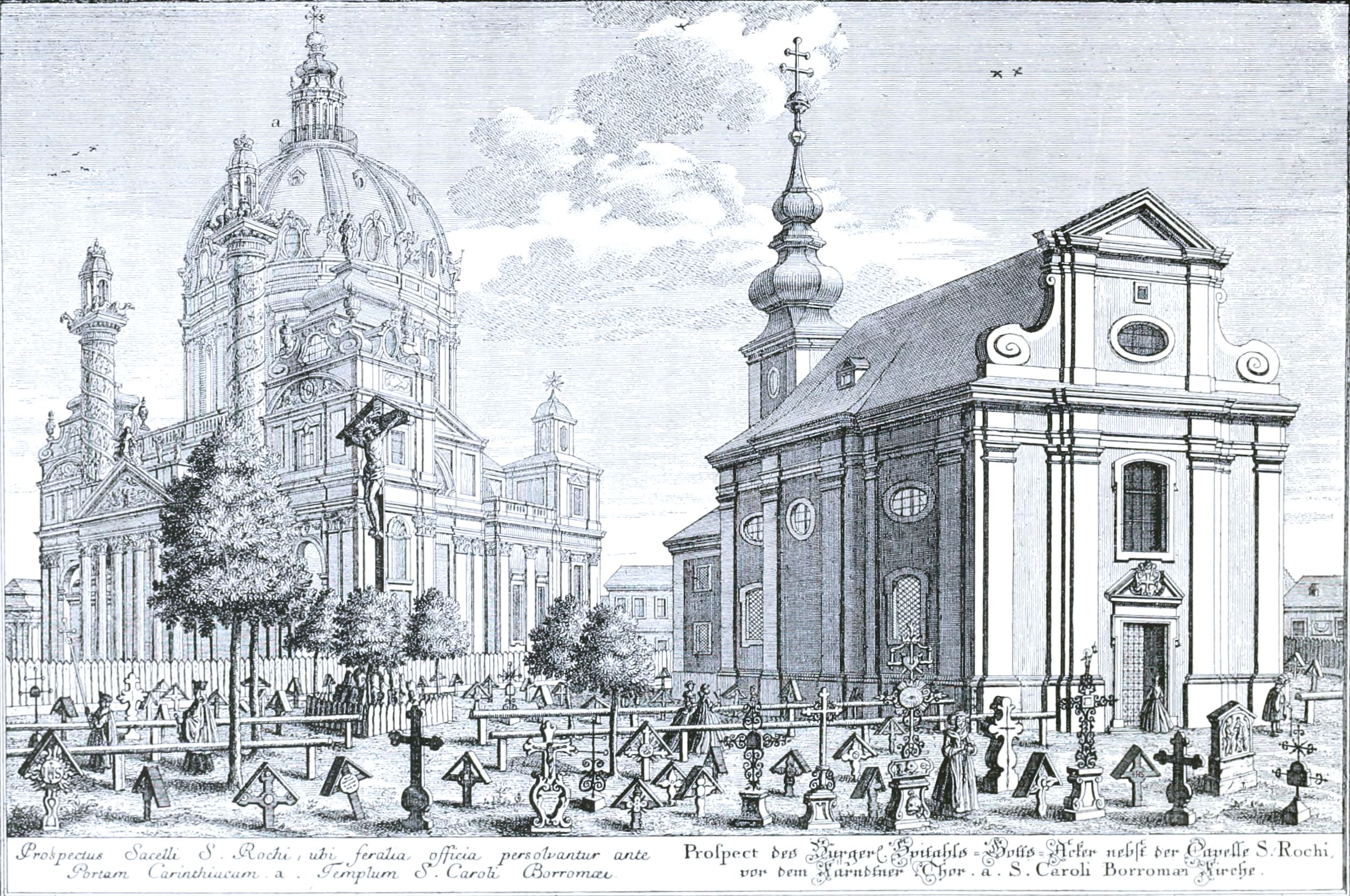
Historic view of the Bürgerspital-Gottesacker cemetery and chapel, where Vivaldi's tomb used to be. They stood next to St. Charles Church until 1807.

Vivaldi probably moved to Vienna to stage operas, especially as he took up residence near the Kärntnertortheater. Shortly after his arrival in Vienna, Charles VI died, which left the composer without any imperial patronage or a steady source of income. Soon afterwards, Vivaldi became impoverished (Note: Landon supplies this assertion and furthermore quotes the report of Vivaldi's death which reached Venice in the Commemorali Gradenigo: "Abbe Lord Antonio Vivaldi, incomparable virtuoso of the violin, known as the Red Priest, much esteemed for his compositions and concertos, who earned more than 50,000 ducats in his life, but his disorderly prodigality caused him to die a pauper in Vienna.") and, during the night of 27/28 July 1741, aged 63, (Note: Talbot (p. 69) gives the 27th as the day of death. Formichetti 2006, p. 194 reports that he died during the night and his death was the first registered on the next day. Heller 1997, p. 263 states: "The composer's death is noted in the official coroner's report and in the burial account book of St. Stephen's Cathedral Parish as having occurred on 28 July 1741". But the so-called Totenbeschauprotokoll is not a reliable source, since the date can refer to when the entry was made, not to the actual time of death.) he died of "internal infection", in a house owned by the widow of a Viennese saddlemaker.

On 28 July, Vivaldi's funeral took place at St. Stephen's Cathedral. Contrary to popular legend, the young Joseph Haydn who was in the cathedral choir at the time had nothing to do with his burial, since no music was performed on that occasion. The funeral was attended by six pall-bearers and six choir boys (Kuttenbuben), at a "mean" cost of 19 florins and 45 kreuzer. Only a Kleingeläut (small peal of bells), the lowest class, was provided, at a cost of 2 florins and 36 kreuzer.

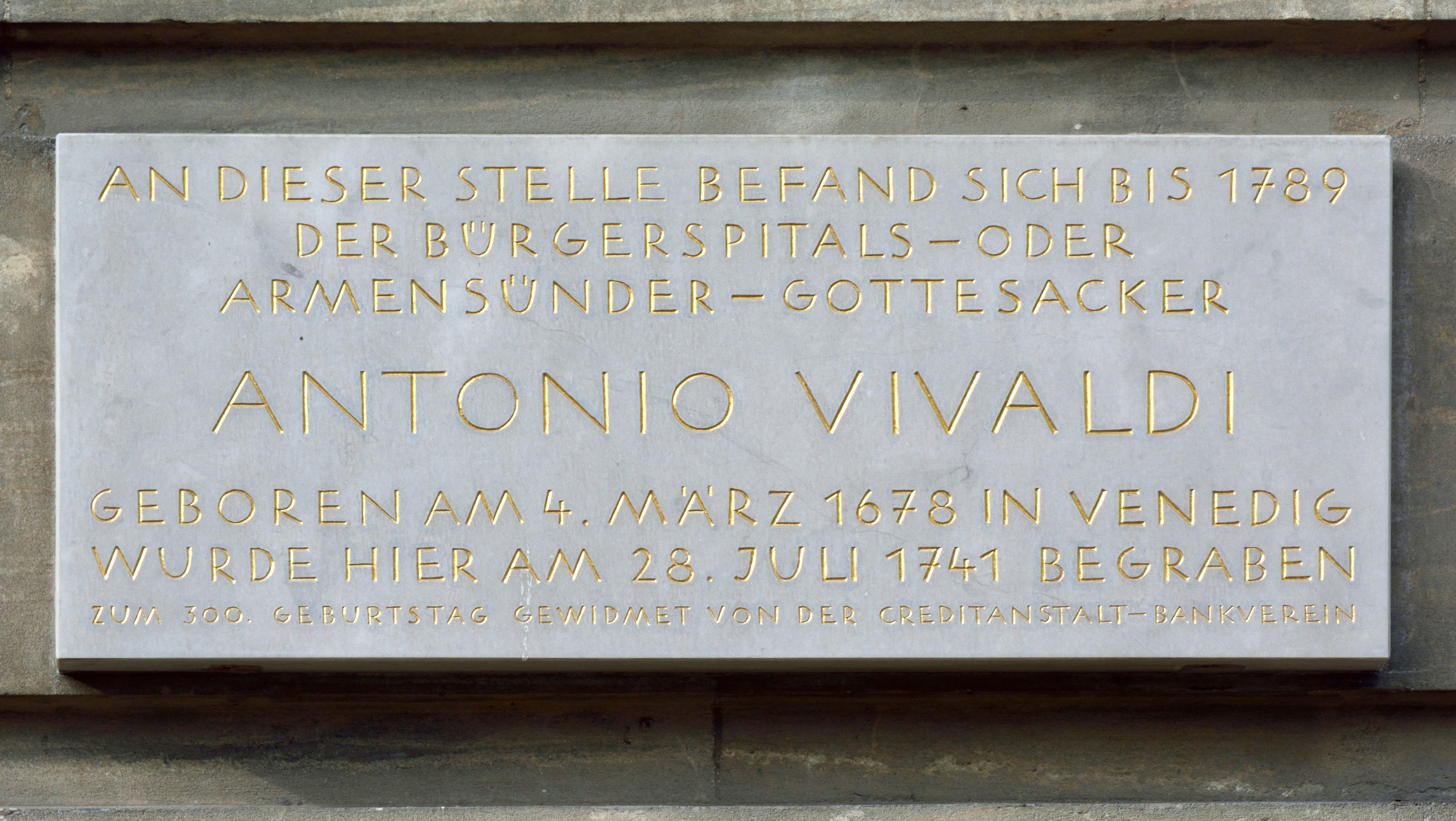
Memorial plaque to Vivaldi's tomb at the main building of the Technical University, dedicated in 1978 by the Creditanstalt-Bankverein

Vivaldi was buried in a simple grave in a burial ground that was owned by the public hospital fund – the Bürgerspital-Gottesacker cemetery, next to St Charles Church, a baroque church in an area that is now part of the site of the TU Wien university. The cemetery existed until 1807. The house where he lived in Vienna has since been destroyed; the Hotel Sacher is built on part of the site. Memorial plaques have been placed at both locations, as well as a Vivaldi "star" in the Viennese Musikmeile and a monument at the Rooseveltplatz.

Only two, possibly three, original portraits of Vivaldi are known to survive: an engraving, an ink sketch and an oil painting. The engraving, which was the basis of several copies produced later by other artists, was made in 1725 by François Morellon de La Cave for the first edition of Il cimento dell'armonia e dell'inventione, and shows Vivaldi holding a sheet of music. The ink sketch, a caricature, was done by Ghezzi in 1723 and shows Vivaldi's head and shoulders in profile. It exists in two versions: a first jotting kept at the Vatican Library, and a much lesser-known, slightly more detailed copy recently discovered in Moscow. The oil painting, which can be seen in the International Museum and Library of Music of Bologna, is by an anonymous artist and is thought to depict Vivaldi due to its strong resemblance to the La Cave engraving.

During his lifetime, Vivaldi was popular in many countries throughout Europe, including France, but after his death his popularity dwindled. After the end of the Baroque period, Vivaldi's published concerti became relatively unknown, and were largely ignored. Even his most famous work, The Four Seasons, was unknown in its original edition during the Classical and Romantic periods. Vivaldi's work was rediscovered in the 20th century.

== Works ==
"La primavera" (Spring) – Movement 1: Allegro from the Four Seasons
A 2000 live performance by Wichita State University Chamber Players.

A composition by Vivaldi is identified by RV number, which refers to its place in the "Ryom-Verzeichnis" or "Répertoire des oeuvres d'Antonio Vivaldi", a catalog created in the 20th century by the musicologist Peter Ryom.

Le quattro stagioni (The Four Seasons) of 1723 is his most famous work. The first four of the 12 concertos, titled Il cimento dell'armonia e dell'inventione ("The Contest between Harmony and Invention"), they depict moods and scenes from each of the four seasons. This work has been described as an outstanding example of pre-19th-century program music. Vivaldi's other notable sets of 12 violin concertos include La stravaganza (The Eccentricity), L'estro armonico (The Harmonic Inspiration) and La cetra (The Lyre).

Vivaldi wrote more than 500 concertos. About 350 of these are for solo instrument and strings, of which 230 are for violin; the others are for bassoon, cello, oboe, flute, viola d'amore, recorder, lute, or mandolin. About forty concertos are for two instruments and strings, and about thirty are for three or more instruments and strings.

As well as more than 50 operas, Vivaldi composed a large body of sacred choral music, such as the Gloria, RV 589; Nisi Dominus, RV 608; Magnificat, RV 610 and Stabat Mater, RV 621. Gloria, RV 589 remains one of Vivaldi's more popular sacred works. Other works include sinfonias, about 90 sonatas and chamber music.

Some sonatas for flute, published as Il Pastor Fido, have been erroneously attributed to Vivaldi, but were composed by Nicolas Chédeville.

=== Catalogues of Vivaldi works ===
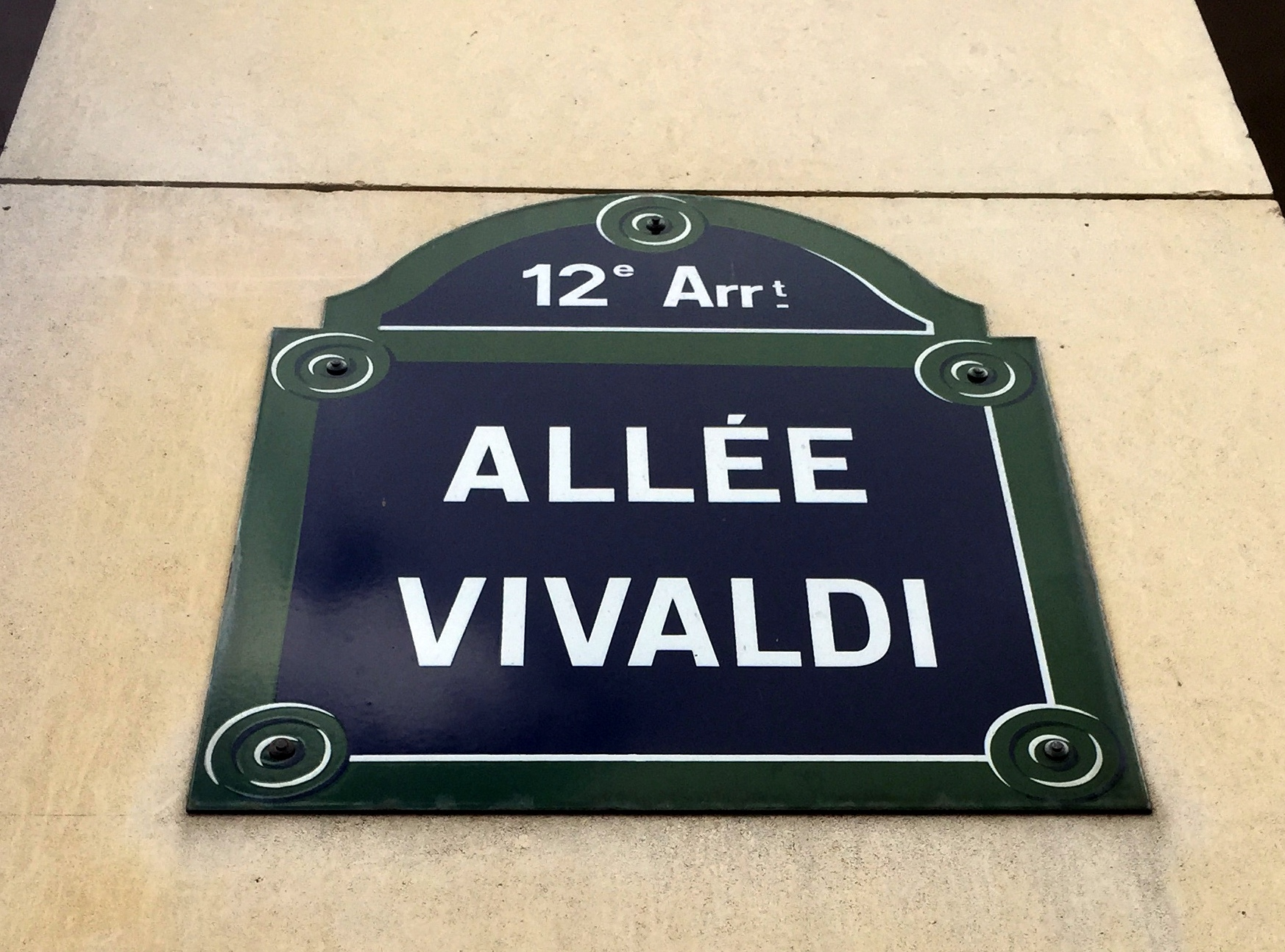
Allée Vivaldi in Paris, named after Antonio Vivaldi

Vivaldi's works attracted cataloging efforts befitting a major composer. Scholarly work intended to increase the accuracy and variety of Vivaldi performances also supported new discoveries that made old catalogs incomplete. Works still in circulation today might be numbered under several different systems (some earlier catalogs are mentioned here).

Because the simply consecutive Complete Edition (CE) numbers did not reflect the individual works (Opus numbers) into which compositions were grouped, numbers assigned by Antonio Fanna were often used in conjunction with CE numbers. Combined Complete Edition (CE)/Fanna numbering was especially common in the work of Italian groups driving the mid-20th-century revival of Vivaldi, such as Gli Accademici di Milano under Piero Santi. For example, the Bassoon Concerto in B♭ major, "La Notte", RV 501, became CE 12, F. VIII,1

Despite the awkwardness of having to overlay Fanna numbers onto the Complete Edition number for meaningful grouping of Vivaldi's oeuvre, these numbers displaced the older Pincherle numbers as the (re-) discovery of more manuscripts had rendered older catalogs obsolete.

This cataloging work was led by the Istituto Italiano Antonio Vivaldi, where Gian Francesco Malipiero was both the director and the editor of the published scores (Edizioni G. Ricordi). His work built on that of Antonio Fanna, a Venetian businessman and the institute's founder, and thus formed a bridge to the scholarly catalog dominant today.

Compositions by Vivaldi are identified today by RV number, the number assigned by Danish musicologist Peter Ryom in works published mostly in the 1970s, such as the "Ryom-Verzeichnis" or "Répertoire des oeuvres d'Antonio Vivaldi". Like the Complete Edition before it, the RV does not typically assign its single, consecutive numbers to "adjacent" works that occupy one of the composer's single opus numbers. Its goal as a modern catalog is to index the manuscripts and sources that establish the existence and nature of all known works. (Note: These several numbering systems are cross-referenced at classical.net.)

=== Style and influence ===
The German scholar Walter Kolneder has discerned the influence of Legrenzi's style in Vivaldi's early liturgical work Laetatus sum (RV Anh 31), written in 1691 at the age of thirteen.

Vivaldi was also influenced by the Composer Arcangelo Corelli.

Johann Sebastian Bach was deeply influenced by Vivaldi's concertos and arias (recalled in his St John Passion, St Matthew Passion, and cantatas). Bach transcribed six of Vivaldi's concerti for solo keyboard, a further three for organ, and one for four harpsichords, strings, and basso continuo (BWV 1065) based upon the concerto for four violins, two violas, cello, and basso continuo (RV 580).

== Legacy ==
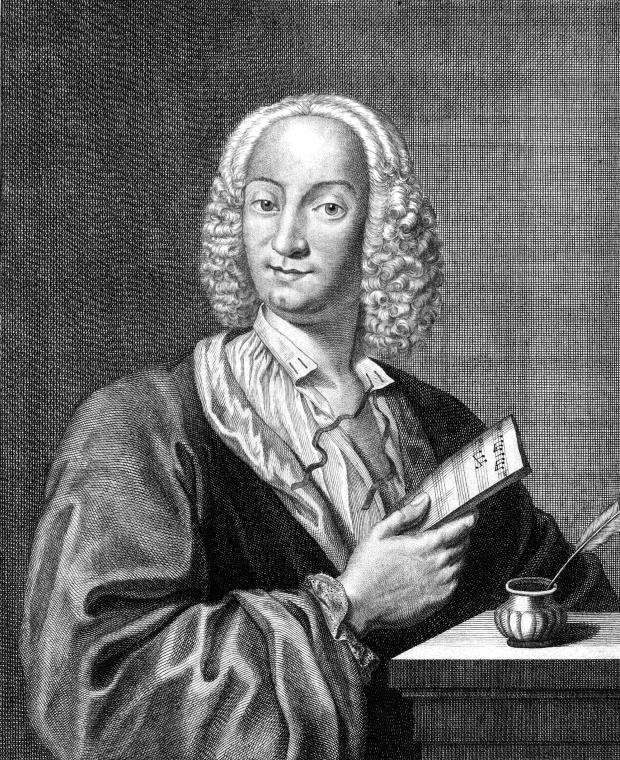
Putative portrait of Antonio Vivaldi (engraving by François Morellon de La Cave, from Michel-Charles Le Cène's edition of Vivaldi's Op. 8, 1725)

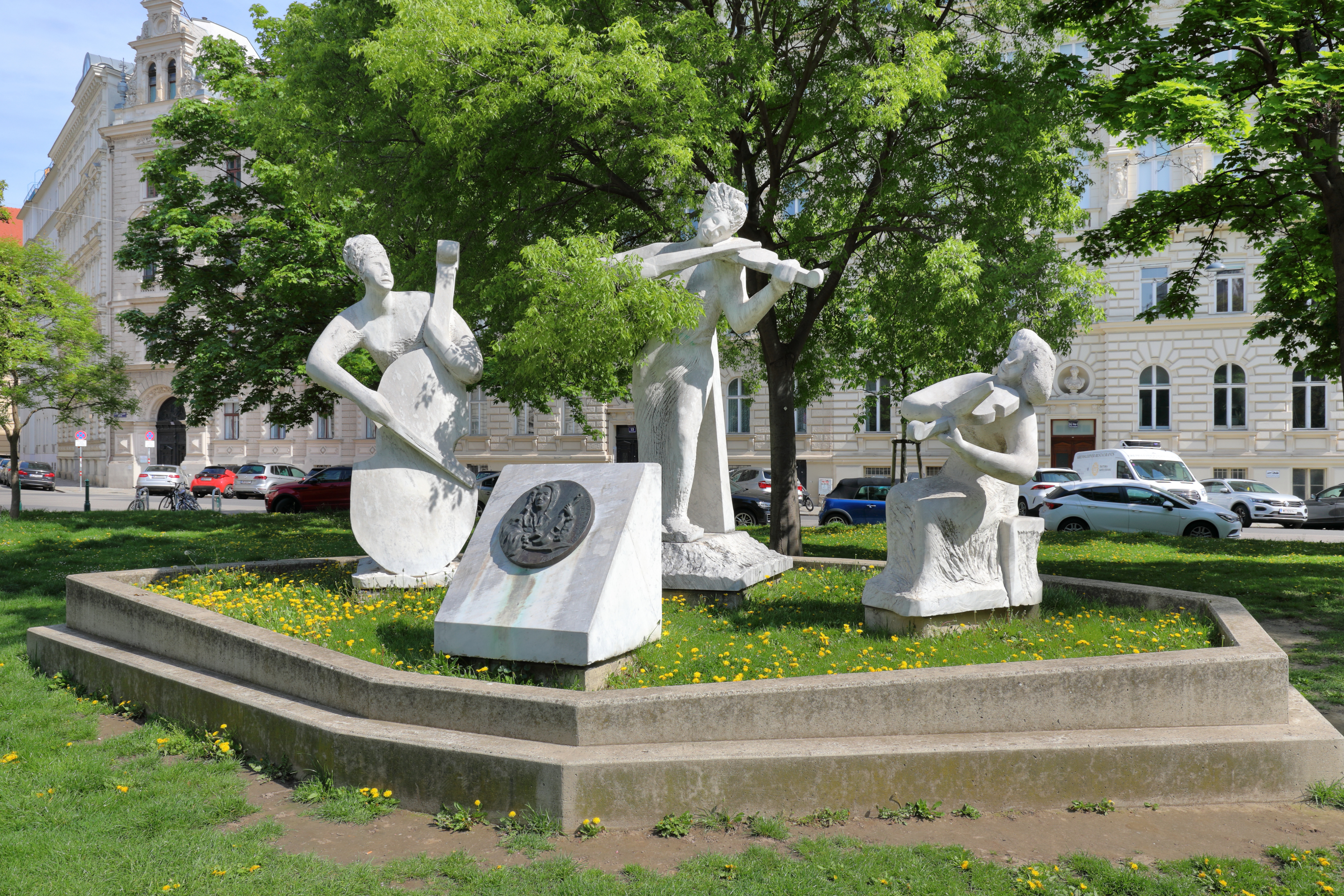
Antonio Vivaldi monument at Rooseveltplatz in Vienna, Austria

In the early 20th century, Fritz Kreisler's Concerto in C, in the Style of Vivaldi (which he passed off as an original Vivaldi work) helped revive Vivaldi's reputation. Kreisler's concerto in C spurred the French scholar Marc Pincherle to begin an academic study of Vivaldi's oeuvre. Many Vivaldi manuscripts were rediscovered, and were acquired by the Turin National University Library as a result of the generous sponsorship of Turinese businessmen Roberto Foa and Filippo Giordano, in memory of their sons. This led to a renewed interest in Vivaldi by, among others, Mario Rinaldi, Alfredo Casella, Ezra Pound, Olga Rudge, Desmond Chute, Arturo Toscanini, Arnold Schering and Louis Kaufman, all of whom were instrumental in the revival of Vivaldi throughout the 20th century.

In 1926, in a monastery in Piedmont, researchers discovered fourteen bound volumes of Vivaldi's work (later discovered to be fifteen) that were previously thought to have been lost during the Napoleonic Wars. Some missing tomes in the numbered set were discovered in the collections of the descendants of the Grand Duke of Durazzo, who had acquired the monastery complex in the 18th century. The volumes contained 300 concertos, 19 operas and over 100 vocal-instrumental works.

The resurrection of Vivaldi's unpublished works in the 20th century greatly benefited from the noted efforts of Alfredo Casella, who in 1939 organized the historic Vivaldi Week, in which the rediscovered Gloria (RV 589) and l'Olimpiade were revived. Since World War II, Vivaldi's compositions have enjoyed wide success. Historically informed performances, often on "original instruments", have increased Vivaldi's fame further still.

Recent rediscoveries of works by Vivaldi include two psalm settings: Psalm 127, Nisi Dominus RV 803 (in eight movements); and Psalm 110, Dixit Dominus RV 807 (in eleven movements). These were identified in 2003 and 2005, respectively, by the Australian scholar Janice Stockigt. The Vivaldi scholar Michael Talbot described RV 807 as "arguably the best nonoperatic work from Vivaldi's pen to come to light since ... the 1920s".

In February 2002, musicologist Steffen Voss discovered 70% of the music for the opera Motezuma (RV 723) in the Sing-Akademie zu Berlin archives. Long thought lost, it was described by Dutch musicologist Kees Vlaardingerbroek as "the most important Vivaldi discovery in 75 years." One of the earliest operas to have been set in the Americas, versions of it were staged in Düsseldorf in 2005 and Long Beach in 2009.

Vivaldi's 1730 opera, Argippo (RV 697), which had also been considered lost, was rediscovered in 2006 by the harpsichordist and conductor Ondřej Macek, whose Hofmusici orchestra performed the work at Prague Castle on 3 May 2008—its first performance since 1730.

Modern depictions of Vivaldi's life include a 2005 radio play, commissioned by ABC Radio National and written by Sean Riley. Entitled The Angel and the Red Priest, the play was later adapted for the stage and performed at the Adelaide Festival of the Arts.

In 2010, Google commemorated the 332nd anniversary of Vivaldi's birth with a Google Doodle showing four violins patterned after The Four Seasons.

George Balanchine's ballet Square Dance (premiered 1957, revised 1976) utilizes Vivaldi's Concerto Grosso in b minor, op. 3, no. 10, and the first movement of his Concerto Grosso in E major, op. 3, no. 12, in its score. In 2016, Canadian choreographer Crystal Pite premiered her ballet based The Four Seasons, The Seasons' Canon, with the Paris Opera Ballet at the Palais Garnier before bringing it to the Royal Ballet in London. The piece subsequently won Pite the Prix Benois de la Danse for Best Choreographer.
