= Coat of arms of Edinburgh =

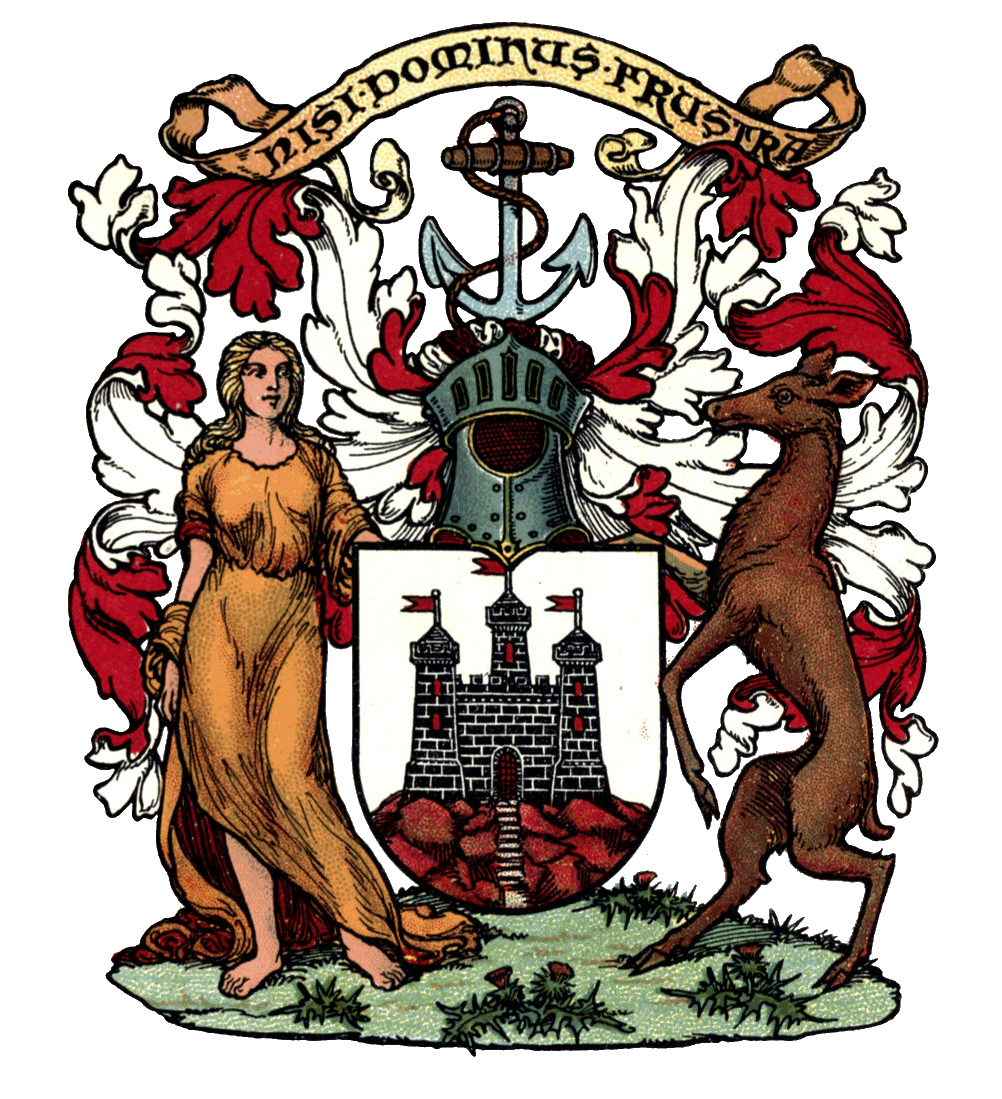
The coat of arms of Edinburgh

The coat of arms of Edinburgh was registered with the Lord Lyon King of Arms in 1732, having been used unofficially for several centuries previously. The central symbol is a heraldic castle, representing Edinburgh Castle. The armiger, or owner, is the City of Edinburgh Council.

== Description ==
The blazon, or heraldic description of the arms, is given in the register of the Lord Lyon King of Arms as: Argent, a castle triple-towered and embattled sable, masoned of the first and topped with three fans gules, windows and portcullis shut of the last, situate on a rock proper. The crest is an anchor wreathed about with a cable all proper, and the supporters are, dexter, a maid richly attir'd with her hair hanging down over her shoulders and, sinister, a doe proper. The motto is Nisi Dominus Frustra.

The castle represents Edinburgh Castle, Edinburgh's principal landmark. The crest, an anchor, represents the Lord Provost's position as Admiral of the Firth of Forth. The dexter supporter, a "woman richly attired with her hair hanging over her shoulders" represents the fact that Edinburgh Castle was historically known as the "Castle of the Maidens" probably due to it being used to protect princesses and noblewomen in times of war. The sinister supporter, a doe, recalls the city's patron saint St Giles who spent much of his life in solitude in the forests of Provence with only a doe for company.

The motto means "Except the Lord in vain", a shortened version of a verse from Psalm 127: "Except the Lord build the house, they labour in vain that build it: except the Lord keep the city, the watchman waketh but in vain."

== Controversy ==
From the 14th century, if not earlier, Edinburgh, like Scotland's other royal burghs, used armorial devices in many ways, including on seals. The coat of arms was formally granted by the Lord Lyon King of Arms in 1732, and recorded in Volume 1 of the Public Register of All Arms and Bearings in Scotland.

In Scotland, it is a statutory requirement to register armorial bearings with the Lord Lyon, who is responsible for regulating the system of Scottish heraldry, in a process known as "matriculation". In 1732, an action was begun against the Edinburgh Town Council for failing to matriculate its burgh arms; whereupon the Council obtained a legal opinion "that the town would not be bound in law to matriculat". Edinburgh asked the Convention of Royal Burghs to make this a test case. The Convention approved expenditure to defend the action and the Town Treasurer's Accounts recorded an entry for legal fees, but no record exists of any subsequent action, suggesting that the case was dropped.

The subject was raised again in 1771, when the Lyon issued a general statement that "all persons whether Nobility, Gentry, Towns or Bodies Corporate, bearing arms any manner or way which are recorded in terms of the Act...to give in or send to the Lyon Office an account of such Arms and of the title whereby they claim to wear the same". On being sent a copy of this statement, the Council reacted by refusing to comply on the grounds that Scotland's royal burghs "had possessed the privilege of using seals and armorial bearings from a remote period which far outdated the Acts of 1592 and 1672, from which the Lord Lyon derived his jurisdiction, and that since neither of these Acts specifically mentioned the Burghs, they did not apply to them" (presumably the same position that had been adopted in 1732). Three years later, a Council Minute of 23 November 1774 recorded the "discovery" among the papers of an Edinburgh lawyer—presumed to have acted for the Council over 40 years previously—of a Certificate of Matriculation of "the Ensigns Armorial or Coat of Arms of the good town of Edinburgh" signed by the Lyon and dated 21 April 1732. The discovery of this Certificate appears to have closed the case as far as Edinburgh was concerned, but other burghs adopted Edinburgh's position of non-compliance with matriculation. When, in 1786, the Convention decided to obtain a seal for its own use, it refused to recognise the Lyon's jurisdiction over the matter and the seal was not obtained until 1821. No arms were registered by the convention for the remainder of its existence until its dissolution in 1975.

== Latest version ==
The traditional arms were used by Edinburgh Town Council until the reorganisation of local government in Scotland in May 1975, when it was succeeded by the City of Edinburgh District Council and a new coat of arms, based on the earlier one, was granted. In 1996, further local government reorganisation resulted in the formation of the City of Edinburgh Council, and again the coat of arms was regranted.

The shield appeared as a quartering in the arms of Prince Philip, Duke of Edinburgh, from 1949 to 2021.

== Gallery ==
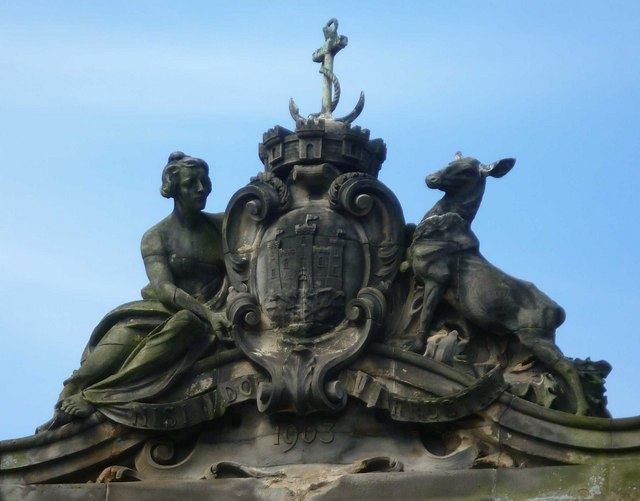
The arms on the City Chambers

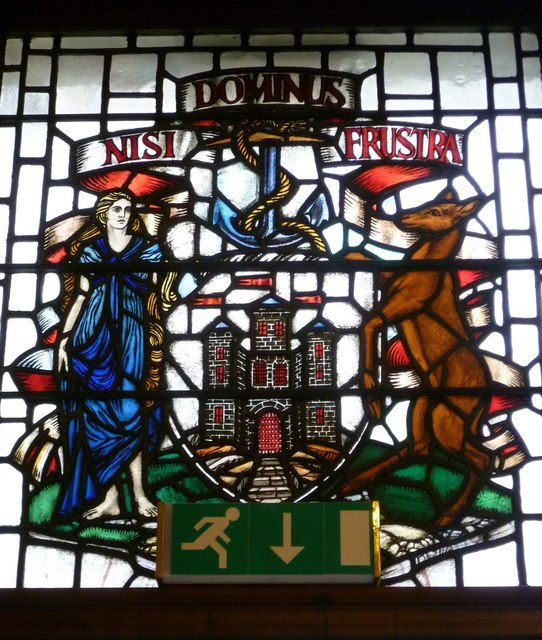
The arms on a window in the City Chambers

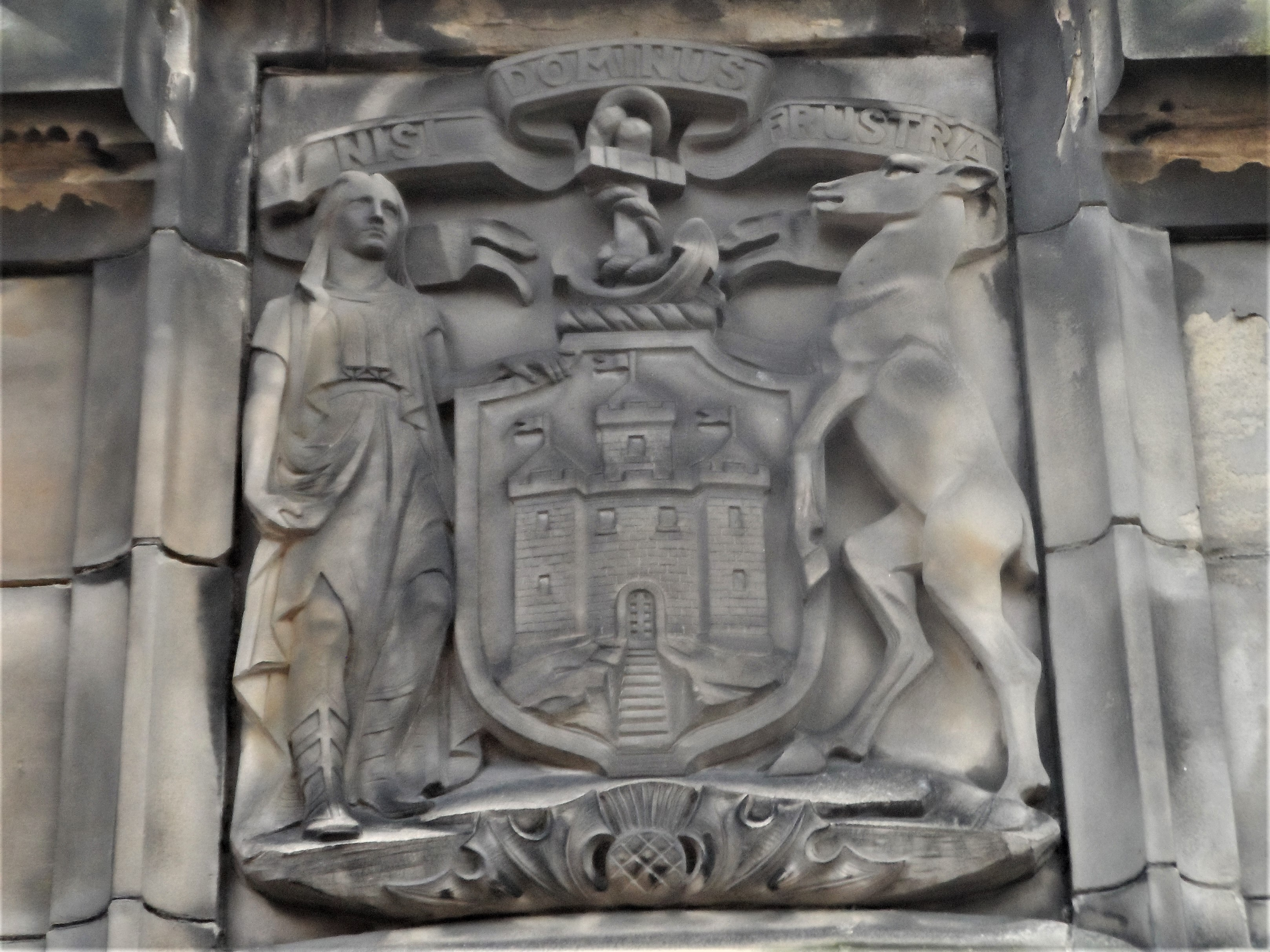
A stone carving of the arms

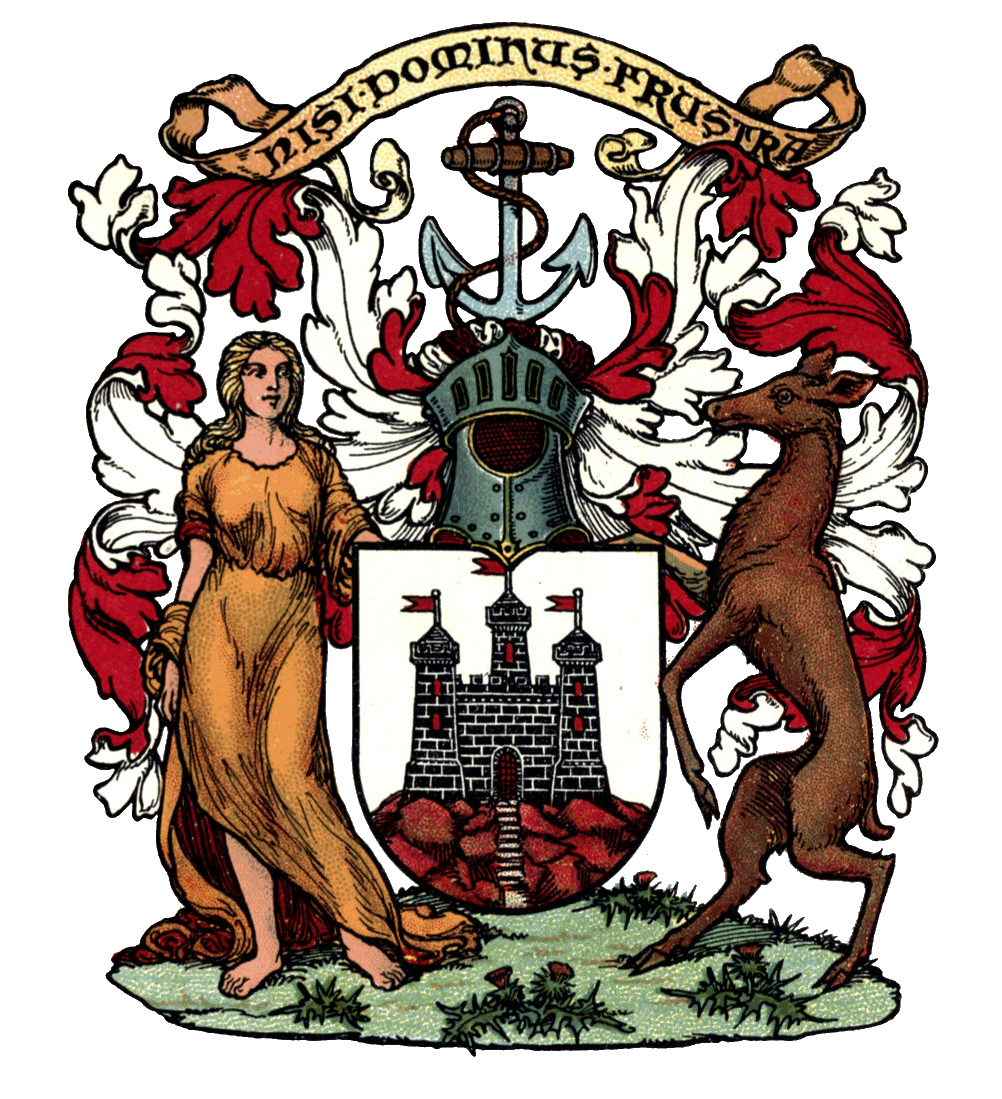
The official arms of Edinburgh, illustrated by Graham Johnston; herald-painter to the Lyon Court, from Plate V of Arthur Fox-Davies's A Complete Guide to Heraldry

Coat of arms of the city of Edinburgh as a whole

Banner of the arms

Coat of arms of the University of Edinburgh

Coat of arms of Prince Philip, Duke of Edinburgh (1949–2021)

== See also ==
- City guard
