= Stabat Mater (Vivaldi) =

Composition by Antonio Vivaldi

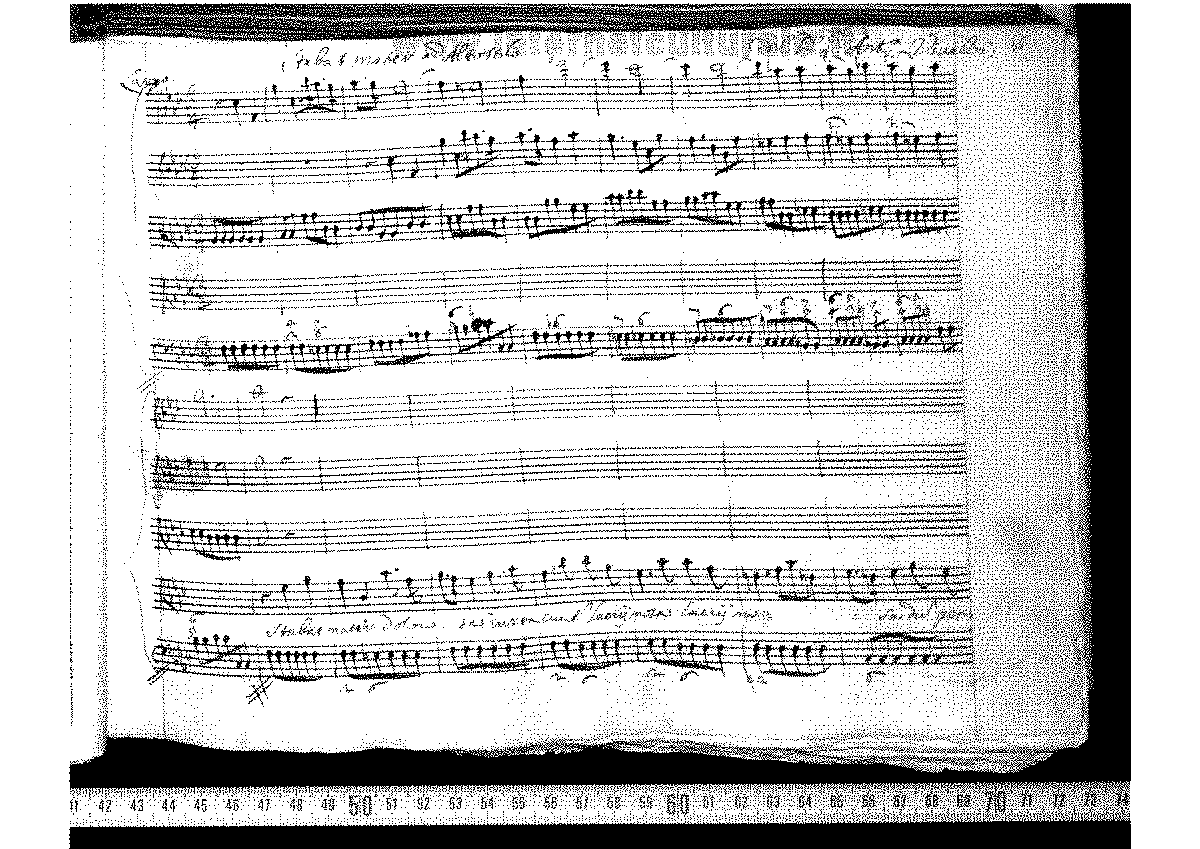
Manuscript of Stabat Mater in the Royal Library of Turin.

Stabat Mater for solo alto and orchestra, RV 621, is a composition by the Italian baroque composer Antonio Vivaldi on one of the Sorrows of Mary. It was premiered in Brescia in 1712.

== Instrumentation ==
The work is scored for violins I & II, violas, solo alto or countertenor and basso continuo.

== Movements ==
Vivaldi's setting of the Stabat Mater only uses the first ten stanzas of the hymn. The music is keyed in F minor, and is generally slow and melancholy, with allegro only being used once in the Amen, and all the other movements not going faster than andante. Movements 4, 5, and 6 are identical to the first three musically. The composition is structured into nine movements as follows:

1. Stabat mater dolorosa
2. Cujus animam gementem
3. O quam tristis et afflicta
4. Quis est homo
5. Quis non posset contristari
6. Pro peccatis suae gentis
7. Eia mater, fons amoris
8. Fac ut ardeat cor meum
9. Amen

== In popular culture ==
A piano transcription of this work was featured prominently in the 1999 film The Talented Mr. Ripley.
