= François Morellon la Cave =

French engraver and painter

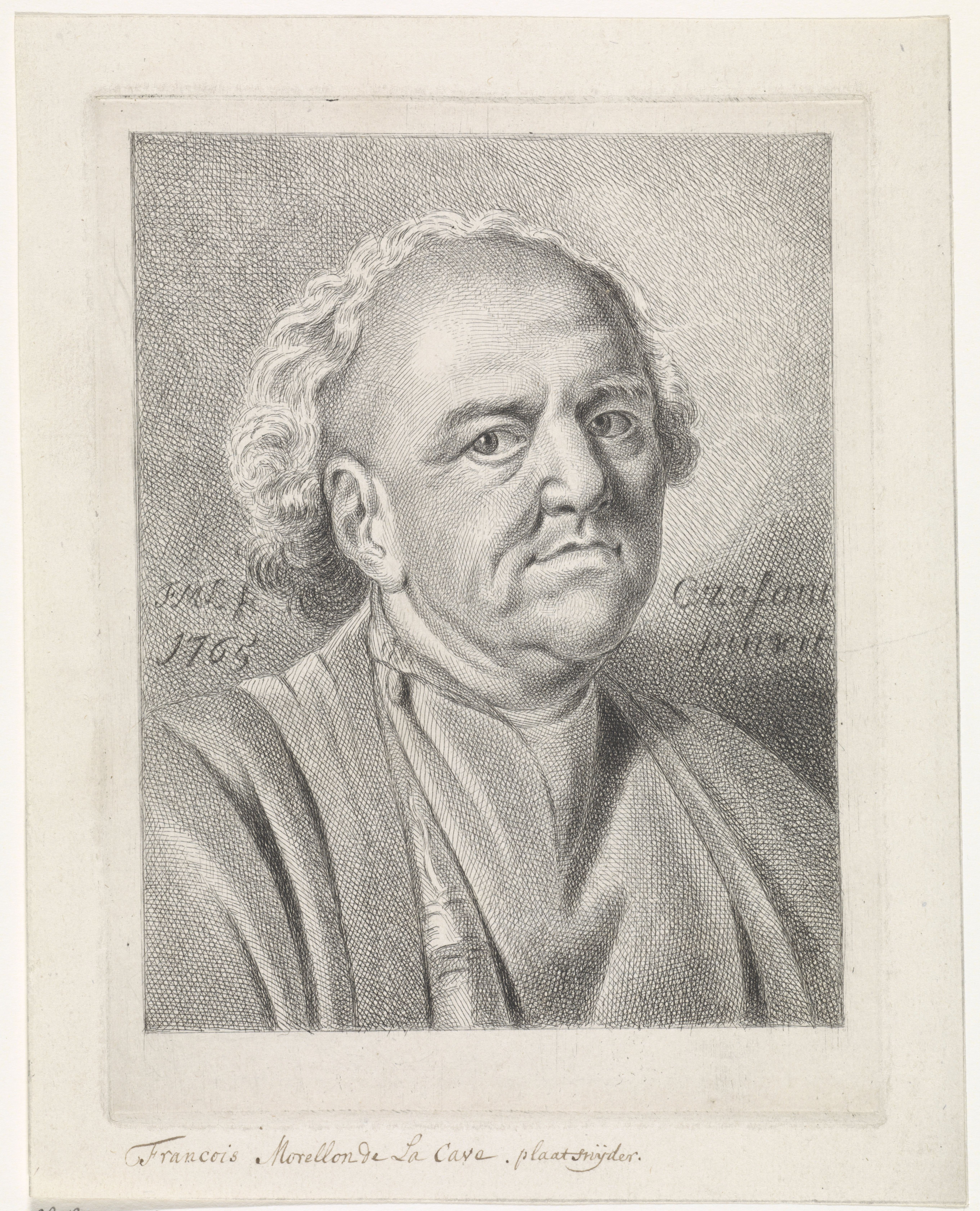
Self portrait by François Morellon la Cave (1765)

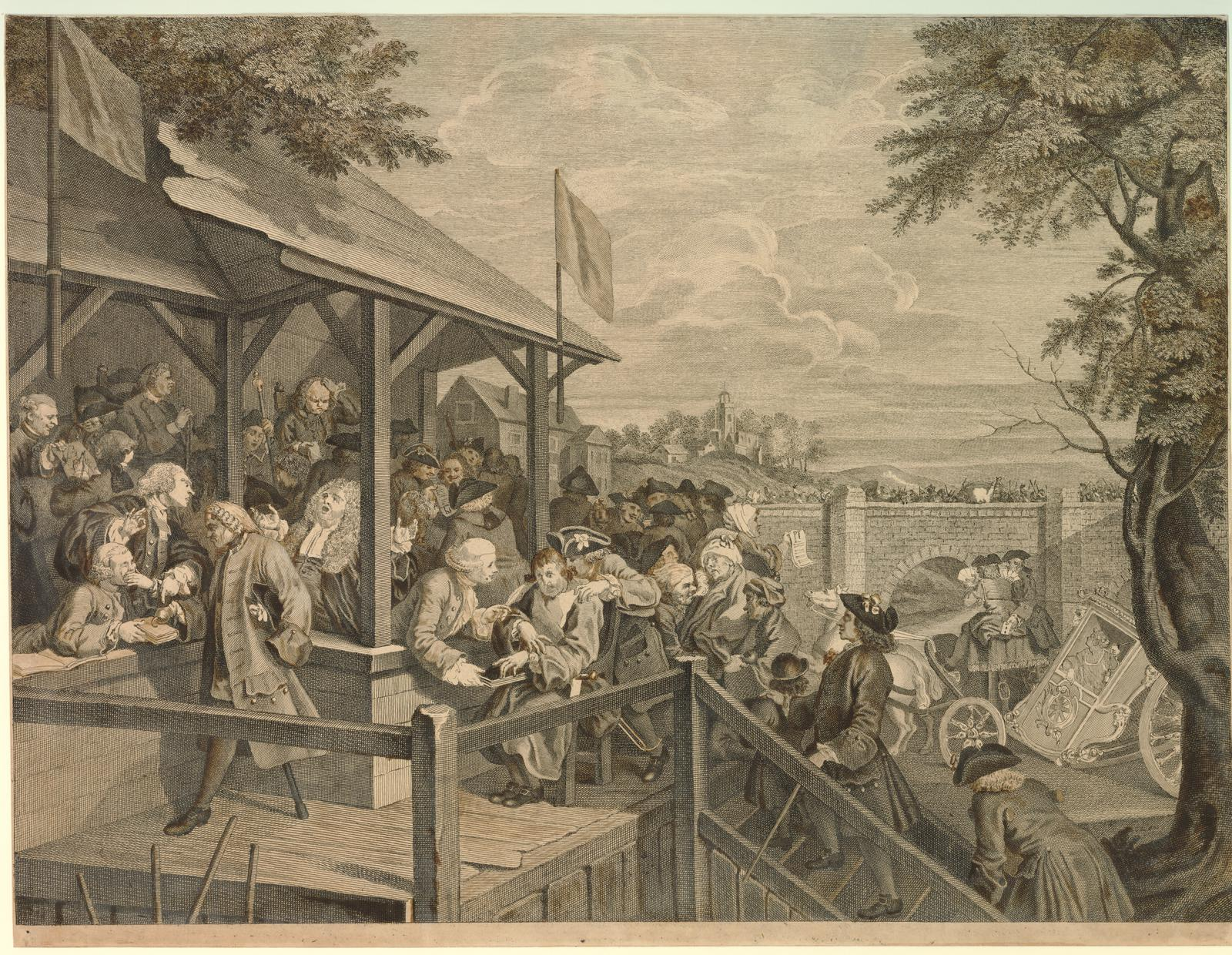
The Polling after William Hogarth (1758)

François Morellon la Cave (15 April 1696 – 9 July 1768) was a painter and engraver of French origin active in Amsterdam.

== Life ==
Morellon la Cave had Huguenot origins and settled in The Hague. His brother Jean was a silversmith. In 1722 he married Jeanne Bouffet, then living at Lijnbaansgracht near Spiegelgracht. The couple had three children. He may have been a student of Bernard Picart. In 1725 he published an engraving of Antonio Vivaldi. He made engravings to illustrate works, including a Dutch edition of Henriade and Tragédies by Voltaire as well as a Parisian edition of the Comentarios Reales de los Incas (1731) by Inca Garcilaso de la Vega. History of England (L'Histoire d'Angleterre) by Paul de Rapin de Thoyras, Volume I–X, was published with illustrations and allegorical end pieces designed and engraved by La Cave between 1724 and 1727.

In 1737 he lived in the Runstraat; around 1750 in London. He is also the author of engravings based on works by William Hogarth and Antoine Coypel as well as portraits of Edward Pococke, professor of Hebrew, Nader Shah Afshar, Prince William, Duke of Cumberland and Willem de Fesch.

Morellon la Cave died in Amsterdam at the age of 72 and was buried in the Walloon Church.
