= Psalm 121 =

121st psalm of the Book of Psalms

- "I will lift up mine eyes unto the hills, from whence cometh my help."
- Song of Ascents
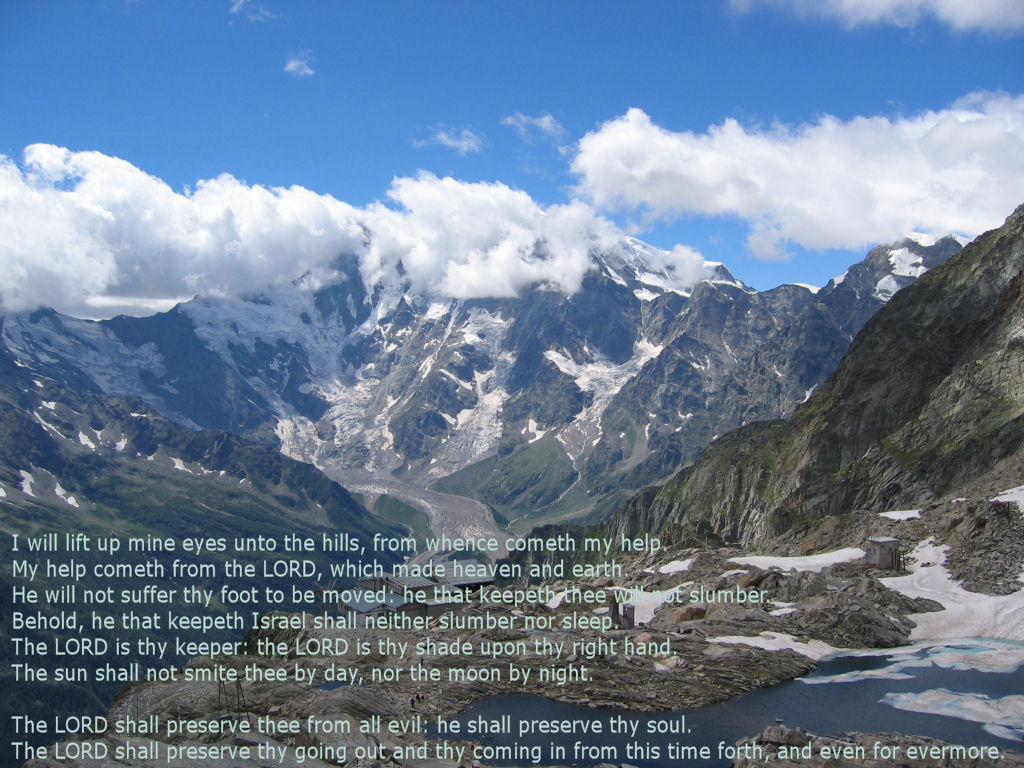
- Looking to the mountains is the opening thought of Psalm 121
- Other name: Psalm 110; "Levavi oculos meos in montes"
- Language: Hebrew (original)

Psalm 121
- ← Psalm 120 Psalm 122 →
- Book: Book of Psalms
- Christian Bible part: Old Testament
- Order in the Christian part: 19

Psalm 121 is the 121st psalm of the Book of Psalms, beginning in English in the King James Version: "I will lift up mine eyes unto the hills, from whence cometh my help”. In the slightly different numbering system used in the Greek Septuagint and Latin Vulgate translations of the Bible, this psalm is Psalm 120. In Latin, it is known as Levavi oculos meos in montes.

It is one of 15 psalms categorized as Song of Ascents (Shir Hama'alot), although unlike the others, it begins, Shir LaMa'alot (A song to the ascents). The psalm is structured as a dialogue, with its opening question, From whence comes my help? being answered, possibly in a temple setting, by the priest.

The psalm forms a regular part of Jewish, Catholic, Lutheran, Anglican and other Protestant liturgies. It has been set to music in several languages. Felix Mendelssohn used it for Hebe deine Augen auf, a trio of his 1846 oratorio Elijah. Leonard Bernstein used the psalm in his Mass.

While various commentators have speculated as to its authorship (with some suggesting King David or Hezekiah), the psalm is anonymous.

== Uses ==
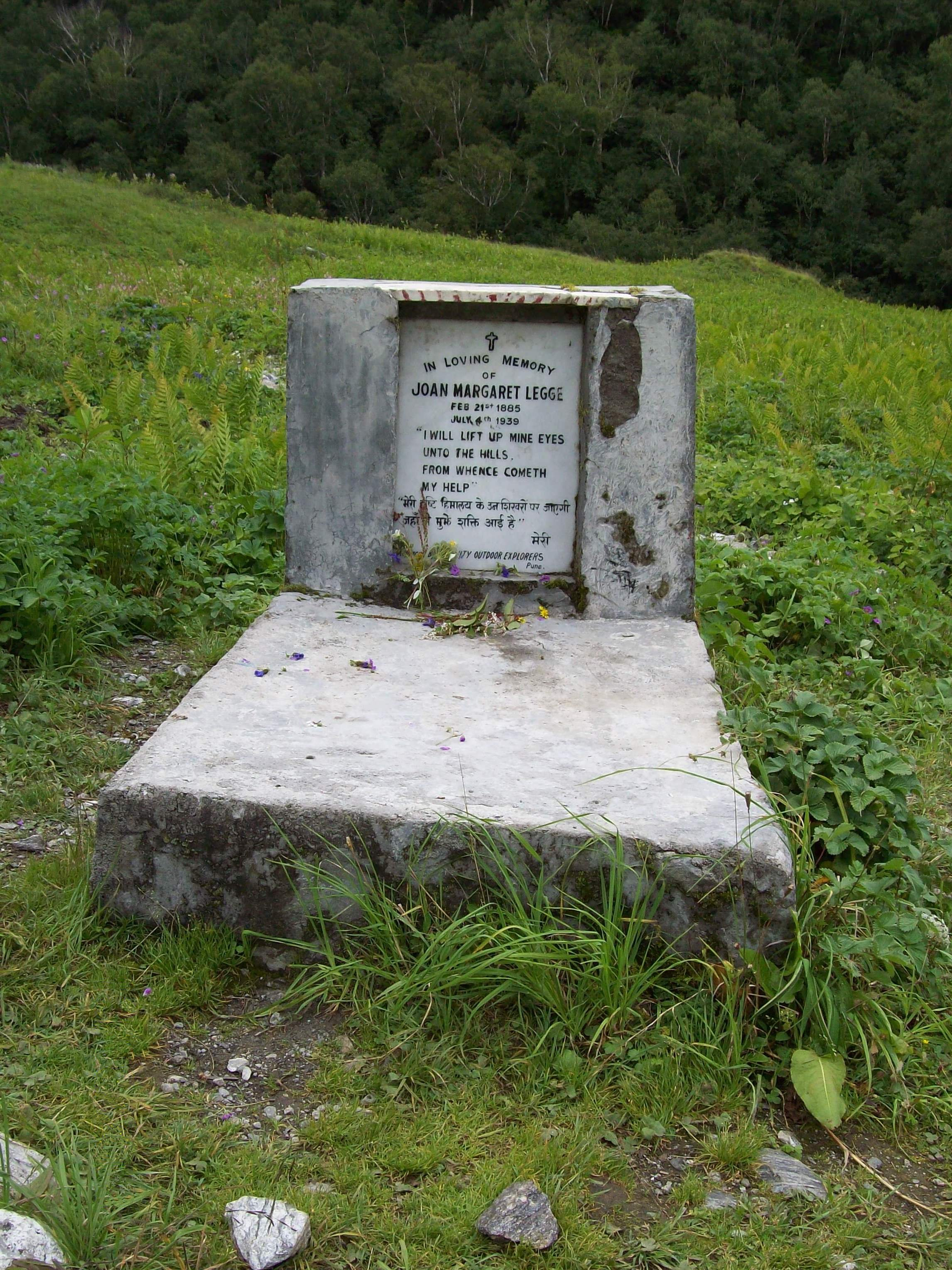
The headstone of the English botanist, Lady Joan Margaret Legge in the Valley of Flowers in the Himalaya, quoting the first verse of Psalm 121

=== Original usage ===
As a song of ascent, this psalm may have been sung by the Levites at the Temple in Jerusalem. It is also possible that it was sung by pilgrims on their way to Jerusalem. At the beginning of the pilgrimage, in the mountainous region of the Judean Hills, the pilgrim recognizes that the Lord is the one who can give him the help he needs. The one who trusts in the Lord is certain that He will bring him protection day and night. The psalm's dialogue moves from the first to the second person in verse 3, and even takes the form of a blessing in verses 7 and 8. This will conclude the prayer of different singers by the prospect of change.

=== Judaism ===
She'ar Yashuv Cohen reading Psalm 121 at the Israel–Jordan peace treaty ceremony

- Is recited in some communities following Mincha between Sukkot and Shabbat Hagadol.
- Verse 4 is part of the prayers of the Bedtime Shema.
- Verse 7 is part of the blessing given by the kohein at a pidyon haben ceremony.
- Verse 8 is part of the prayers of the Bedtime Shema.

=== Coptic Orthodox Church ===
In the Agpeya, the Coptic Church's book of hours, this psalm is prayed in the office of Vespers and the second watch of the Midnight office. It is also in the prayer of the Veil, which is generally prayed only by monks.

=== Protestant Christianity ===
Psalm 121 has the Latin incipit, Levavi oculus. In the Anglican Book of Common Prayer, it is prescribed for use on day 27 of each month, at Morning Prayer. The first verse is frequently quoted on monuments and memorials commemorating those inspired by mountains or hills. A well known example is a stained glass window in Church of St Olaf, Wasdale in the English Lake District National Park, which quotes Psalm 121 as a memorial to members of the Fell & Rock Climbing Club who were killed in the First World War.

Charles Spurgeon called it a soldier's song as well as a traveller's hymn. David Livingstone read the Psalm with his family at the dockside on his leaving for Africa. In The Living Bible, writer Kenneth N. Taylor reads the opening verse in a slightly different many from most translations: Shall I look to the mountain gods for help? ^{2} No! My help is from Jehovah who made the mountains!

=== Catholic Church ===
Around 530, St. Benedict of Nursia chose this Psalm for the third office during the week, specifically from Tuesday until Saturday between Psalm 120 (119) and Psalm 122 (121). Allocating Psalm 119 (118), which is longer, to the services on Sunday and Monday, he structured offices of the week with the following nine psalms. In the Liturgy of Hours today, Psalm 121 is recited Vespers Friday of the second week. In the liturgy of the Word, it took the 29th Sunday in Ordinary Time, year C. It is during this period that the Church prays for refugees.

== Musical settings ==
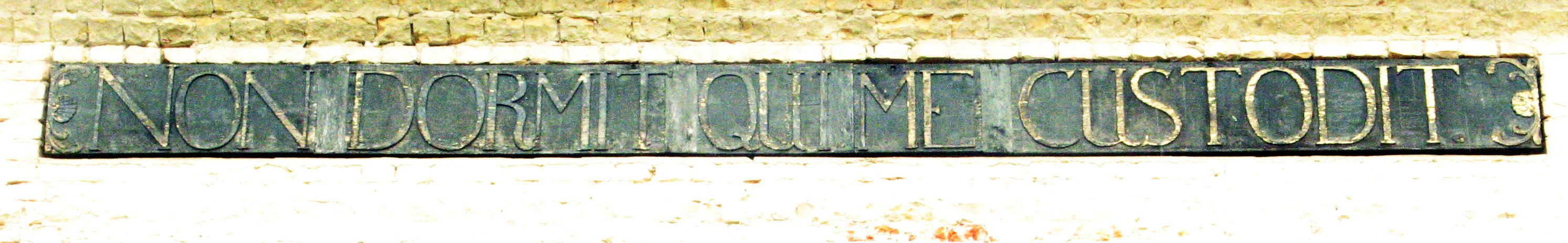
Latin inscription of Psalm 121 on the pediment of the Dannenwalde Manor house, Germany

Musical settings for the Latin text have been composed by Orlando di Lasso, Hans Leo Hassler, and Herbert Howells amongst others.

Settings composed for the English text include John Clarke-Whitfeld, Charles Villiers Stanford, Henry Walford Davies, Mildred Barnes Royse, and Imant Raminsh.

Heinrich Schütz created a version in German for four voices and basso continuo, SWV 31. He also wrote a setting of a metred paraphrase of the psalm in German, "Ich heb mein Augen sehnlich auf", SWV 122, for the Becker Psalter, published first in 1628.

Felix Mendelssohn composed the famous "Hebe deine Augen auf" as a trio of his oratorio Elijah, Op. 70, in 1846. Antonín Dvořák set verses 1–4 in Czech to music in his Biblical Songs, published in 1894.

Zoltán Kodály composed his Geneva Ps CXXI for mixed chorus a cappella), setting the psalm in Hungarian.

The setting by William McKie was sung at the wedding of Princess Margaret in 1960 and at the funeral of Queen Elizabeth The Queen Mother in 2002.

Alan Hovhaness set the psalm in 1967 for his cantata I Will Lift Up Mine Eyes.

Leonard Bernstein used the psalm in his Mass in the second movement in 1971.

Israeli Hasidic singer-songwriter Yosef Karduner composed a popular Hebrew version of Psalm 121, Shir LaMa'alot (2000), which has been covered by many Israeli artists, including Omer Adam, Ninet Tayeb, Mosh Ben-Ari, the Shalva Band, among others. It is a staple amongst synagogue youth groups in Israel and Canada.

Christopher Tin's Grammy-nominated soundtrack to the 2021 video game Old World contains a setting of the psalm in Arabic.

== Influence ==
The motto of The University of Calgary, "Mo shùile togam suas" (Scots Gaelic; in English: "I will lift up my eyes"), is derived from Psalm 121, as is the motto of the University of North Carolina at Asheville, "Levo oculos meos in montes".

In his World War I-era “Close Ranks” editorial, W.E.B. Du Bois wrote, “We make no ordinary sacrifice, but we make it gladly and willingly with our eyes lifted to the hills.”

Several contemporary Israeli poets, such as Leah Goldberg and Haim Gouri, wrote poems named after the psalm's first words ("I will lift my eyes to the mountains") or a variation of them.

Yarra Valley Grammar co-educational grammar school, located in Ringwood, a suburb of Melbourne, Australia uses the motto Levavi Oculos.

== Text ==
The following table shows the Hebrew text of the Psalm with vowels, alongside the Koine Greek text in the Septuagint and the English translation from the King James Version. Note that the meaning can slightly differ between these versions, as the Septuagint and the Masoretic Text come from different textual traditions. (Note: A 1917 translation directly from Hebrew to English by the Jewish Publication Society can be found here or here, and an 1844 translation directly from the Septuagint by L. C. L. Brenton can be found here. Both translations are in the public domain.) In the Septuagint, this psalm is numbered Psalm 120.

#	Hebrew	English	Greek
1	שִׁ֗יר לַֽמַּ֫עֲל֥וֹת אֶשָּׂ֣א עֵ֭ינַי אֶל־הֶהָרִ֑ים מֵ֝אַ֗יִן יָבֹ֥א עֶזְרִֽי׃	(A Song of degrees.) I will lift up mine eyes unto the hills, from whence cometh my help.	᾿ῼδὴ τῶν ἀναβαθμῶν. - ΗΡΑ τοὺς ὀφθαλμούς μου εἰς τὰ ὄρη, ὅθεν ἥξει ἡ βοήθειά μου.
2	עֶ֭זְרִי מֵעִ֣ם יְהֹוָ֑ה עֹ֝שֵׂ֗ה שָׁמַ֥יִם וָאָֽרֶץ׃	My help cometh from the LORD, which made heaven and earth.	ἡ βοήθειά μου παρὰ Κυρίου τοῦ ποιήσαντος τὸν οὐρανὸν καὶ τὴν γῆν.
3	אַל־יִתֵּ֣ן לַמּ֣וֹט רַגְלֶ֑ךָ אַל־יָ֝נ֗וּם שֹׁמְרֶֽךָ׃	He will not suffer thy foot to be moved: he that keepeth thee will not slumber.	μὴ δῴης εἰς σάλον τὸν πόδα σου, μηδὲ νυστάξῃ ὁ φυλάσσων σε.
4	הִנֵּ֣ה לֹֽא־יָ֭נוּם וְלֹ֣א יִישָׁ֑ן שׁ֝וֹמֵ֗ר יִשְׂרָאֵֽל׃	Behold, he that keepeth Israel shall neither slumber nor sleep.	ἰδοὺ οὐ νυστάξει οὐδὲ ὑπνώσει ὁ φυλάσσων τὸν ᾿Ισραήλ.
5	יְהֹוָ֥ה שֹׁמְרֶ֑ךָ יְהֹוָ֥ה צִ֝לְּךָ֗ עַל־יַ֥ד יְמִינֶֽךָ׃	The LORD is thy keeper: the LORD is thy shade upon thy right hand.	Κύριος φυλάξει σε, Κύριος σκέπη σοι ἐπὶ χεῖρα δεξιάν σου·
6	יוֹמָ֗ם הַשֶּׁ֥מֶשׁ לֹֽא־יַכֶּ֗כָּה וְיָרֵ֥חַ בַּלָּֽיְלָה׃	The sun shall not smite thee by day, nor the moon by night.	ἡμέρας ὁ ἥλιος οὐ συγκαύσει σε, οὐδὲ ἡ σελήνη τὴν νύκτα.
7	יְֽהֹוָ֗ה יִשְׁמׇרְךָ֥ מִכׇּל־רָ֑ע יִ֝שְׁמֹ֗ר אֶת־נַפְשֶֽׁךָ׃	The LORD shall preserve thee from all evil: he shall preserve thy soul.	Κύριος φυλάξει σε ἀπὸ παντὸς κακοῦ, φυλάξει τὴν ψυχήν σου ὁ Κύριος.
8	יְֽהֹוָ֗ה יִשְׁמׇר־צֵאתְךָ֥ וּבוֹאֶ֑ךָ מֵ֝עַתָּ֗ה וְעַד־עוֹלָֽם׃	The LORD shall preserve thy going out and thy coming in from this time forth, and even for evermore.	Κύριος φυλάξει τὴν εἴσοδόν σου καὶ τὴν ἔξοδόν σου ἀπὸ τοῦ νῦν καὶ ἕως τοῦ αἰῶνος.
