= Clara H. Scott =

American composer, hymnwriter and publisher

- Born: Fiske; December 3, 1841; Elk Grove, Illinois
- Died: June 21, 1897 (aged 55); Dubuque, Iowa
- Notable work: Royal Anthem Book, 1882; Open My Eyes, That I May See, 1895

Clara H. Scott (December 3, 1841 – June 21, 1897), née Fiske, was an American composer, hymnwriter and publisher.

Along with Anna Bartlett Warner, Phoebe Palmer, and Fanny Crosby, Scott was among a wave of late 19th century women gospel poets. She was the first woman to publish a volume of anthems, the Royal Anthem Book, in 1882. Scott was also well known for her hymn, Open My Eyes, That I May See, written in 1895. The hymn was inspired by Psalm 119, verse 18. She died in 1897 after being thrown from her carriage by a spooked horse.
