= Psalm 120 =

120th psalm of the book of psalms

- "In my distress I cried unto the LORD, and he heard me"
- Song of Ascents
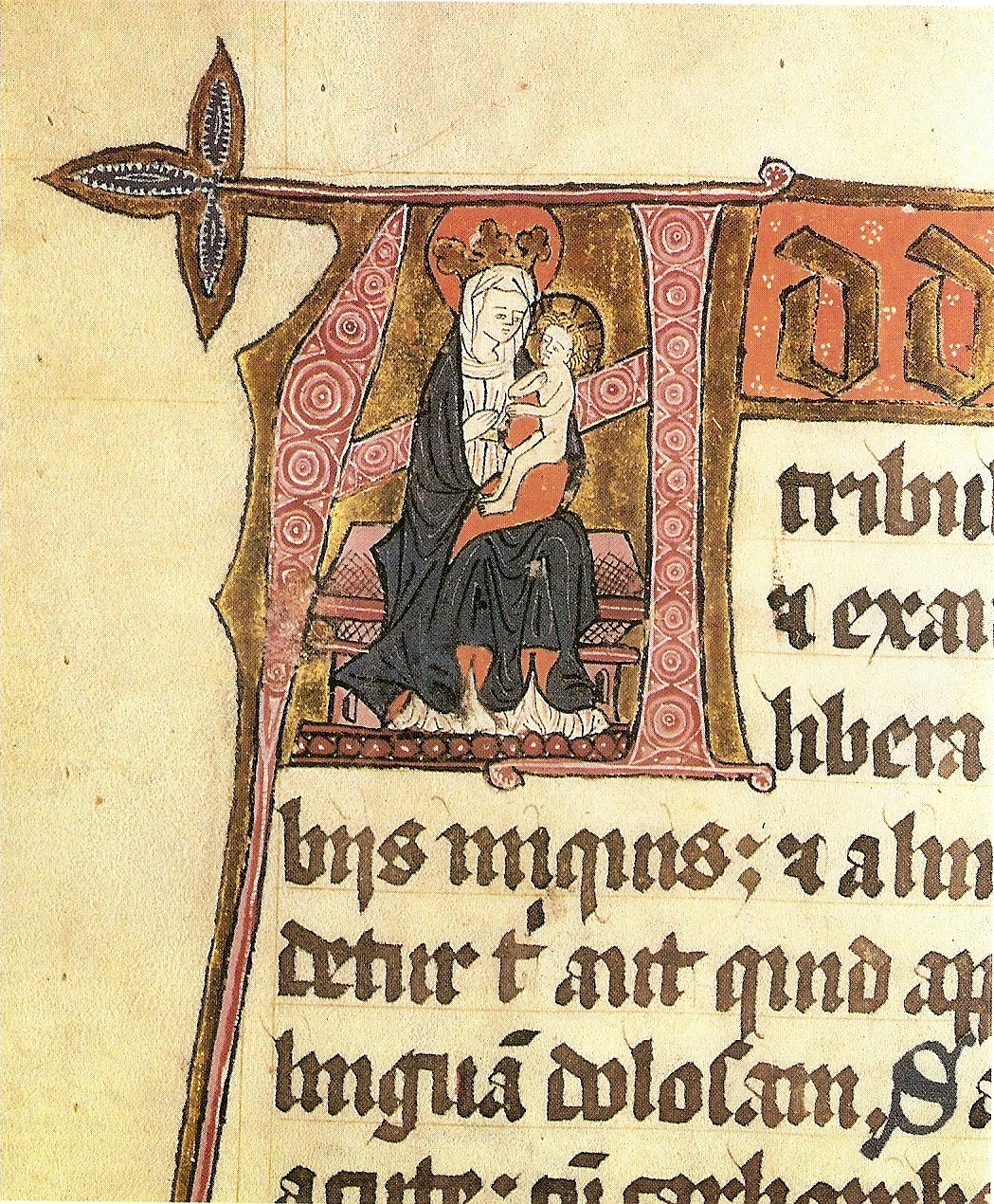
- Virgin with child with initial A of Psalm 120 (Ad dominum), painted by nun Birgitta Sigfusdatter in the Birgitta Monastery
- Other name: Psalm 119; Ad Dominum cum tribularer clamavi
- Language: Hebrew (original)

Psalm 120
- ← Psalm 119 Psalm 121 →
- Book: Book of Psalms
- Hebrew Bible part: Ketuvim
- Order in the Hebrew part: 1
- Category: Sifrei Emet
- Christian Bible part: Old Testament
- Order in the Christian part: 19

Psalm 120 is the 120th psalm of the Book of Psalms, beginning in the English of the King James Version: "In my distress I cried unto the LORD, and he heard me". In the slightly different numbering system used in the Greek Septuagint and Latin Vulgate translations of the Bible, this psalm is Psalm 119. In Latin, it is known as "Ad Dominum cum tribularer clamavi". It is one of 15 psalms categorized as Song of Ascents (Shir Hama'alot).

The psalm forms a regular part of Jewish, Catholic, Lutheran, Anglican and other Protestant liturgies. It has been set to music in several languages.

== Uses ==
=== Judaism ===
This psalm is recited in some communities following Mincha between Sukkot and Shabbat Hagadol.

=== Catholic Church ===
According to the Rule of St. Benedict set in 530, this psalm was sung or recited during the third office during the week, namely from Tuesday until Saturday, followed by Psalm 121 (120) and Psalm 122 (121) and after the offices of the Sunday and Monday were occupied with Psalm 119, which is the longest among the 150 psalms.

In the Liturgy of the Hours, Psalm 120 is now recited in Vespers on the Monday of the fourth week of the four weekly liturgical cycle.

=== Coptic Orthodox Church ===
In the Agpeya, the Coptic Church's book of hours, this psalm is prayed in the office of Vespers and the second watch of the Midnight office.

=== Other ===
At the Palazzo Bocchi in Bologna, an inscription on the facade quotes verse 2 in Hebrew.

== Musical settings ==
William Byrd set the psalm to eight voices, with minor variations in the text. The music is found in a 1578 manuscript of polyphony.

Heinrich Schütz wrote a setting of a paraphrase of the psalm in German, "Ich ruf zu dir, mein Herr und Gott", SWV 225, for the Becker Psalter, published first in 1628. Giacomo Giuseppe Saratelli set it is one of his 150 psalm settings in Latin, for choir, orchestra and basso continuo.

== Text ==
The following table shows the Hebrew text of the Psalm with vowels, alongside the Koine Greek text in the Septuagint and the English translation from the King James Version. Note that the meaning can slightly differ between these versions, as the Septuagint and the Masoretic Text come from different textual traditions. (Note: A 1917 translation directly from Hebrew to English by the Jewish Publication Society can be found here or here, and an 1844 translation directly from the Septuagint by L. C. L. Brenton can be found here. Both translations are in the public domain.) In the Septuagint, this psalm is numbered Psalm 119.

| # | Hebrew | English | Greek |
|---|---|---|---|
| 1 | שִׁ֗יר הַֽמַּ֫עֲל֥וֹת אֶל־יְ֭הֹוָה בַּצָּרָ֣תָה לִּ֑י קָ֝רָ֗אתִי וַֽיַּעֲנֵֽנִי׃ | (A Song of degrees.) In my distress I cried unto the LORD, and he heard me. | ᾿ῼδὴ τῶν ἀναβαθμῶν. - ΠΡΟΣ Κύριον ἐν τῷ θλίβεσθαί με ἐκέκραξα, καὶ εἰσήκουσέ μου. |
| 2 | יְֽהֹוָ֗ה הַצִּ֣ילָה נַ֭פְשִׁי מִשְּׂפַת־שֶׁ֑קֶר מִלָּשׁ֥וֹן רְמִיָּֽה׃ | Deliver my soul, O LORD, from lying lips, and from a deceitful tongue. | Κύριε, ῥῦσαι τὴν ψυχήν μου ἀπὸ χειλέων ἀδίκων καὶ ἀπὸ γλώσσης δολίας. |
| 3 | מַה־יִּתֵּ֣ן לְ֭ךָ וּמַה־יֹּסִ֥יף לָ֗ךְ לָשׁ֥וֹן רְמִיָּֽה׃ | What shall be given unto thee? or what shall be done unto thee, thou false tongue? | τί δοθείη σοι καὶ τί προστεθείη σοι πρὸς γλῶσσαν δολίαν; |
| 4 | חִצֵּ֣י גִבּ֣וֹר שְׁנוּנִ֑ים עִ֝֗ם גַּחֲלֵ֥י רְתָמִֽים׃ | Sharp arrows of the mighty, with coals of juniper. | τὰ βέλη τοῦ δυνατοῦ ἠκονημένα, σὺν τοῖς ἄνθραξι τοῖς ἐρημικοῖς. |
| 5 | אֽוֹיָה־לִ֭י כִּי־גַ֣רְתִּי מֶ֑שֶׁךְ שָׁ֝כַ֗נְתִּי עִֽם־אׇהֳלֵ֥י קֵדָֽר׃ | Woe is me, that I sojourn in Mesech, that I dwell in the tents of Kedar! | οἴμοι! ὅτι ἡ παροικία μου ἐμακρύνθη, κατεσκήνωσα μετὰ τῶν σκηνωμάτων Κηδάρ. |
| 6 | רַ֭בַּת שָֽׁכְנָה־לָּ֣הּ נַפְשִׁ֑י עִ֝֗ם שׂוֹנֵ֥א שָׁלֽוֹם׃ | My soul hath long dwelt with him that hateth peace. | πολλὰ παρῴκησεν ἡ ψυχή μου. |
| 7 | אֲֽנִי־שָׁ֭לוֹם וְכִ֣י אֲדַבֵּ֑ר הֵ֝֗מָּה לַמִּלְחָמָֽה׃ | I am for peace: but when I speak, they are for war. | μετὰ τῶν μισούντων τὴν εἰρήνην ἤμην εἰρηνικός· ὅταν ἐλάλουν αὐτοῖς, ἐπολέμουν με δωρεάν. |

=== Verse 5 ===
Woe is me, that I dwell in Meshech,
That I dwell among the tents of Kedar!

"Woe is me" is a typical expression of despair. Meshech and Kedar (or Qedar) were "typical enemies [of Israel], who forced their way into the kingdom of Judah and vexed the people of God".
