= It is time to work for the Lord =

Biblical phrase

"It is time to work for the Lord" (Hebrew: עת לעשות לה' הפרו תורתך) is the first half of a Psalm verse that has served as a dramatic slogan at several junctures in Rabbinic Judaism.

Psalm 119:126 states: "It is time for the Lord to act, for your law has been broken" (New Oxford Annotated Bible ad loc.; Biblical Hebrew: עֵ֭ת לַעֲשֹׂ֣ות לַיהוָ֑ה הֵ֝פֵ֗רוּ תֹּורָתֶֽךָ, romanized: ʿēt̲ laʿăśot̲ lad̲onāy hēp̄ēru torāt̲ek̲ā; Ancient Greek: καιρὸς τοῦ ποιῆσαι τῷ Κυρίῳ· διεσκέδασαν τὸν νόμον σου; Latin: Tempus faciendi Domino; dissipaverunt legem tuam). This verse suggests that God will deliver the steadfast when the wicked break the commandments.

However, in the readings of rabbinic midrash, an alternate meaning of the verse is given, due to an ambiguity in the Biblical Hebrew: instead of God acting in response to sin, humans should act on behalf of God. Thus, the verse may be understood as: "It is time to work for the Lord..."

== History ==
The tanna Hillel the Elder cited the verse to call fellow Jews to study the Torah when it is neglected. (Ephraim Urbach interprets Hillel as calling for fuller observance of the Torah commandments in general, The Sages pp. 341f.) Rabbi Nathan makes a related gesture, for Jewish efforts against heresy, at the end of Mishnah Berakhot. Nathan transposes the two halves of the verse thus: "They have made void your law, it is time to work for the Lord." (See Urbach, 836n.93)

In the Talmudic period, the verse is thus called upon to justify the radical shift in rabbinic belief after the destruction of the Temple. Due to the conditions of exilic Jewry, the rabbinic leadership decided to permit the Oral Torah to be transcribed in writing and disseminated. The verse means that "It is better that one letter of the Torah [the verse forbidding the writing down of the Oral Torah] should be uprooted than that the whole of the Torah be forgotten." (Temurah 14b, Elon Jewish Law 5:1, Louis Jacobs, p. 133 trans.)

In the modern era, the dramatic character of the verse again enters the stage. The verse is used to justify rabbinic innovations in halakha. In the Age of Enlightenment, both Reform and their Orthodox rabbis cited the verse to justify the urgent nature of their actions ("It is time to act for the Lord"). The two conflicting positions see quite different referents for the verse's "they have voided the law"—the Reformers felt the need to accommodate the growing disinterest in Jewish law. In contrast, the Orthodox felt that the Reformers were voiding the law.
