= Palazzo Bocchi =

Building in Bologna, Italy

Coordinates: 44.496883°N 11.344904°E

The Palazzo Bocchi is a Renaissance style palace located on Via Goito 16 in central Bologna, region of Emilia-Romagna, Italy.

== History ==
This building was commissioned by the writer Achille Bocchi in 1545 using designs from Jacopo Barozzi da Vignola, and was where he founded his Hermatena Academy. The name of the academy derives from Hermes, god of eloquence, and Athena, goddess of wisdom. The interior was frescoed by Prospero Fontana.

Two original inscriptions run along the rusticated base of the facade: one in Hebrew reproduces a verse from psalm 120 in Jewish characters and reads: "Deliver me from the liars, God! They smile so sweetly but lie through their teeth." The other in Latin and is taken from the Epistle 1 by Horace and reads: "Rex eris, aiunt, si recte facies" ("do well, thou shalt be crowned").
