= Psalm 119 =

Biblical psalm

- "Blessed are the undefiled in the way"
- Hymn psalm
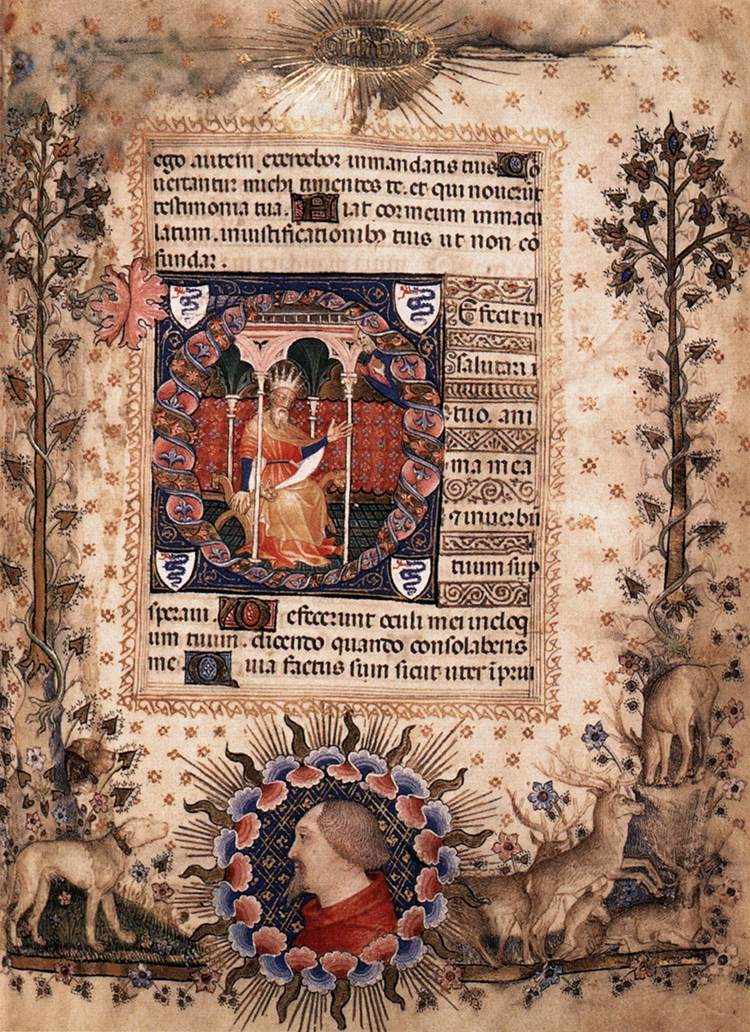
- Manuscript of verse 81 by Giovannino de' Grassi, Biblioteca Nazionale, Florence
- Other name: Psalm 118 (Vulgate); "Beati inmaculati in via"
- Language: Hebrew (original)

Psalm 119
- ← Psalm 118 Psalm 120 →
- Book: Book of Psalms
- Hebrew Bible part: Ketuvim
- Order in the Hebrew part: 1
- Category: Sifrei Emet
- Christian Bible part: Old Testament
- Order in the Christian part: 19

Psalm 119 is the 119th psalm of the Book of Psalms, beginning in the English of the King James Version: "Blessed are the undefiled in the way, who walk in the law of the Lord". The Book of Psalms is in the third section of the Hebrew Bible, the Ketuvim, and a book of the Christian Old Testament. The psalm, which is anonymous, is referred to in Hebrew by its opening words, "Ashrei temimei derech" ("happy are those whose way is perfect"). In Latin, it is known as "Beati inmaculati in via qui ambulant in lege Domini".

The psalm is a hymn psalm and an acrostic poem, in which each set of eight verses begins with a letter of the Hebrew alphabet. The theme of the verses is the prayer of one who delights in and lives by the Torah, the sacred law. Psalms 1, 19 and 119 may be referred to as "the psalms of the Law".

In the slightly different numbering system used in the Greek Septuagint and Latin Vulgate translations of the Bible, this psalm is Psalm 118. With 176 verses, it is the longest psalm as well as the longest chapter in the Bible.

The psalm forms a regular part of Jewish, Orthodox, Catholic, Lutheran, Anglican and other Protestant liturgies. It has often been set to music. British politician William Wilberforce recited the entire psalm while walking back from Parliament, through Hyde Park, to his home.

== Background and themes ==
In Judaism, Psalm 119 has the monikers Alpha-Beta and Temanya Apin (Aramaic: "eight faces").

== Structure ==
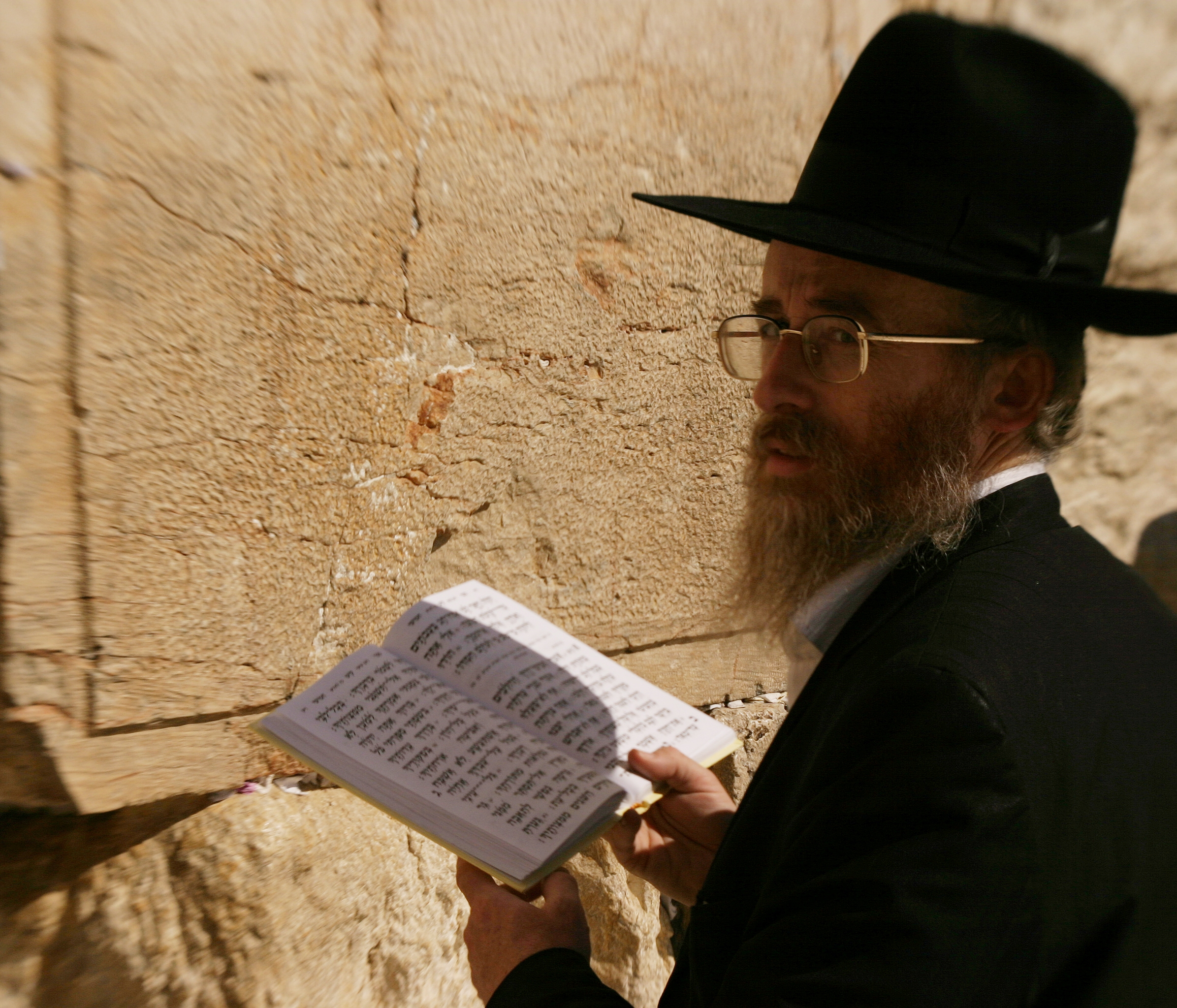
A Haredi Jew reciting Psalm 119 at the Western Wall

Psalm 119 is one of several acrostic poems found in the Bible. Its 176 verses are divided into 22 stanzas, one for each of the 22 characters that make up the Hebrew alphabet. In the Hebrew text, each of the eight verses of each stanza begins with the same Hebrew letter. This feature was not maintained in the Septuagint, except that many manuscripts have placed at the beginning of each stanza the name of the corresponding Hebrew letter (for example, ʾalef the first stanza, the last is taw).

Because of this structure, the Psalm was one of the main occurrences of the Hebrew alphabet in the texts of the medieval and modern West. A Romanized version of the names of all the Hebrew letters, in a red typeface, can be seen in this circa 1455 Gutenberg edition of the Latin Vulgate; in which someone also added by hand the Hebrew letters Aleph through Zayin in the margin.

Each of the 22 sections of 8 verses is subheaded with the name of a letter in the Hebrew alphabet. These subheadings are spelled very differently in the various Bible text versions, even in translations. Their antiquated spellings shown in the Authorized King James Version of 1611 were written with influences of Latin and German medieval theological scholarship—forms that greatly differ from the standard modern-day renditions.

Some printed editions (such as the Jewish Publication Society's The Holy Scriptures, the New International Version and the Legacy Standard Bible) also show the actual Hebrew letters along with these subheadings.

Section	Hebrew Letter	Hebrew Letter Name		Verses
Section	Hebrew Letter	KJV (1611)	Modern	Verses
I	א	Aleph	ʾAlef	1–8
II	ב	Beth	Beth	9–16
III	ג	Gimel	Gimel	17–24
IV	ד	Daleth	Daleth	25–32
V	ה	He	Heʾ	33–40
VI	ו	Vau (Vav)	Waw	41–48
VII	ז	Za(j)in	Zayin	49–56
VIII	ח	Cheth	Ḫeth	57–64
IX	ט	Teth	Ṭeth	65–72
X	י	Jod	Yudh	73–80
XI	כ	C(h)aph	Kaf	81–88
XII	ל	Lamed	Lamedh	89–96
XIII	מ	Mem	Mem	97–104
XIV	נ	Nun	Nun	105–112
XV	ס	Samech	Samekh	113–120
XVI	ע	A(j)in	ʿAyin	121–128
XVII	פ	Pe	Peʾ	129–136
XVIII	צ	Tzaddi(k)	Ṣadheh	137–144
XIX	ק	Koph	Quf	145–152
XX	ר	Res(c)h	Resh	153–160
XXI	ש	S(ch)in	Śin / Shin	161–168
XXII	ת	Tau (Tav)	Taw	169–176

== Literary features ==
Psalm 119 is one of about a dozen alphabetic acrostic poems in the Bible. Its 176 verses are divided into twenty-two stanzas, one stanza for each letter of the Hebrew alphabet; within each stanza, each of the eight verses begins (in Hebrew) with that letter. The name of God (Yahweh/Jehovah) appears twenty-four times.

Employed in almost every verse of the psalm is a synonym for the Torah, such as dabar ("word, promise"), mishpatim ("rulings"), etc. Biblical commentator C. S. Rodd identifies 8 such words, generally translated as 'law', 'promise', 'word', 'statutes', 'commandments', 'ordinances', 'decrees', and 'precepts' in the New Revised Standard Version. But he considers it "unlikely" that all eight words were originally to be found in every stanza, as some scholars have suggested.

The acrostic form and the use of the Torah words are the framework of an elaborate prayer. The grounds for the prayer are established in the first two stanzas (alef and beth): the Torah is held up as a source of blessing and right conduct, and the psalmist pledges to dedicate himself to the law. The prayer proper begins in the third stanza (gimel, v. 17). Like many other psalms, it includes dramatic lament (e.g. verses 81–88), joyous praise (e.g. verses 45–48), and prayers for life, deliverance, and vindication (e.g. verses 132–34). What makes Psalm 119 unique is the way that these requests are continually and explicitly grounded in the gift of the Torah and the psalmist's loyalty to it.

The first and fifth verses in a stanza often state the same theme followed by a statement of opposition, affliction or conflict, and the final (eighth) verse tends to be a transition introducing the next stanza. Several dozen prayers are incorporated into the Psalm, e.g. "Open my eyes that I may behold wondrous things out of your law." Themes include opposition by man, affliction, delight in the law and the goodness of God, which sometimes run into each other: "I know, O Lord, that your rules are righteous, and that in faithfulness you have afflicted me" (v. 75), or "If your law had not been my delight, I would have perished in my affliction" (v. 92). It ends with an appeal to God to seek his servant who strayed.

== Uses ==
=== Judaism ===
- Verse 66 is recited before the shofar blowing on Rosh Hashanah.
- Verse 72 is quoted in Pirkei Avot, Chapter 6, no. 9.
- Verses 89–91 are recited during the blessings before the Shema on the second day of Rosh Hashanah.
- Verse 99 is quoted in Pirkei Avot, Chapter 4, no. 1.
- Verse 108 is recited prior to the shofar blowing on Rosh Hashanah.
- Verse 122 is recited prior to the shofar blowing on Rosh Hashanah.
- Verse 142 is part of Uva Letzion and Tzidkatcha.
- Parts of verses 153–54 comprise the blessing Re'eh of the weekday Amidah.
- Verse 160 is recited prior to the shofar blowing on Rosh Hashanah.
- Verse 162 is recited prior to the shofar blowing on Rosh Hashanah.
- Verse 165 is part of Talmud Berachos 64a.
- Verses 166, 162, and 165 are recited in that order by the mohel at a brit milah.

=== Eastern Orthodox ===
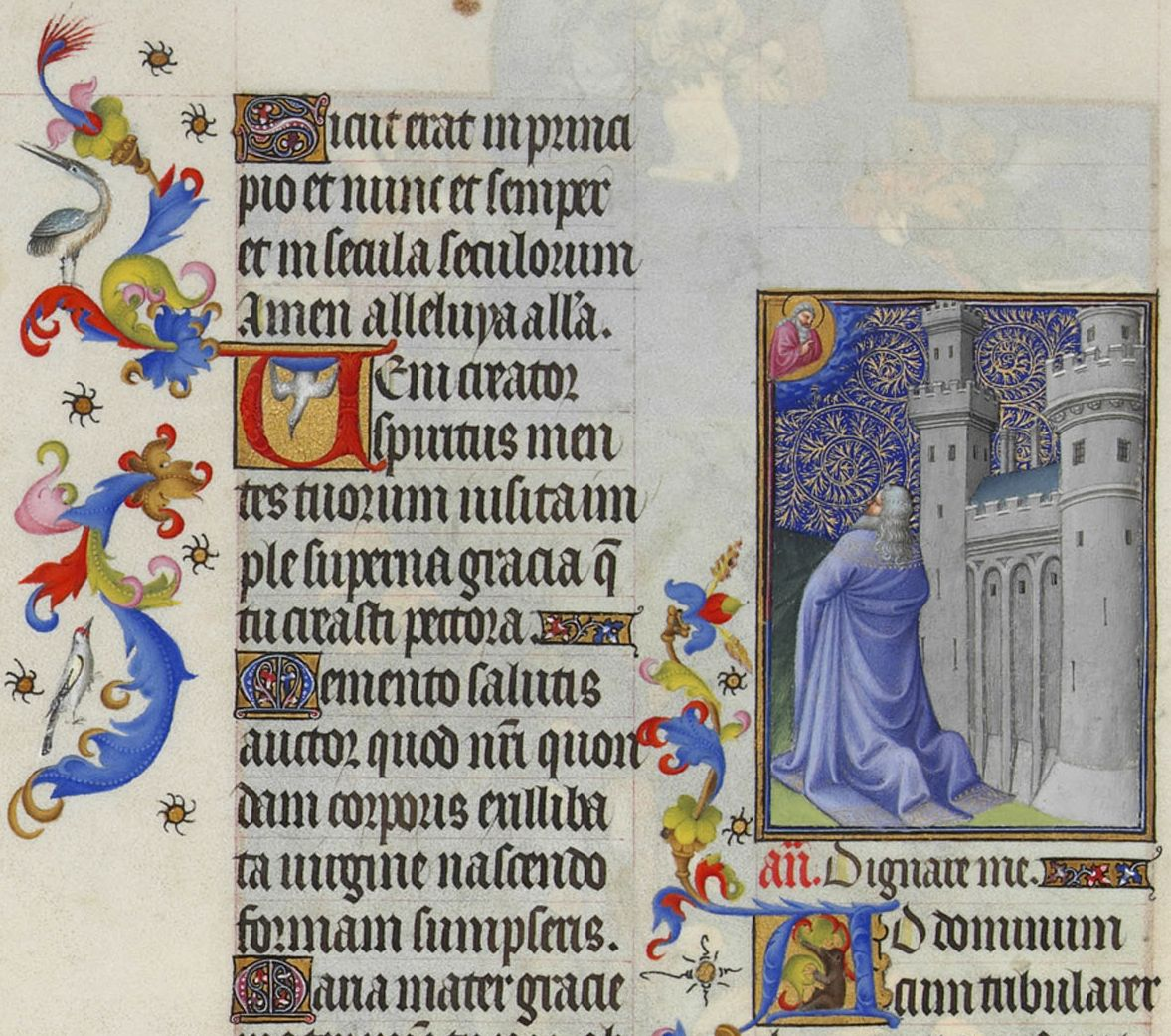
Les Très Riches Heures du duc de Berry, Folio 49r – David Releases Prisoners the Musée Condé, Chantilly

The psalm (118 in the Septuagint) figures prominently in the worship of the Eastern Orthodox Church. There is a tradition that King David used this psalm to teach his young son Solomon the alphabet—but not just the alphabet for writing letters: the alphabet of the spiritual life.

=== Latin Church liturgy ===
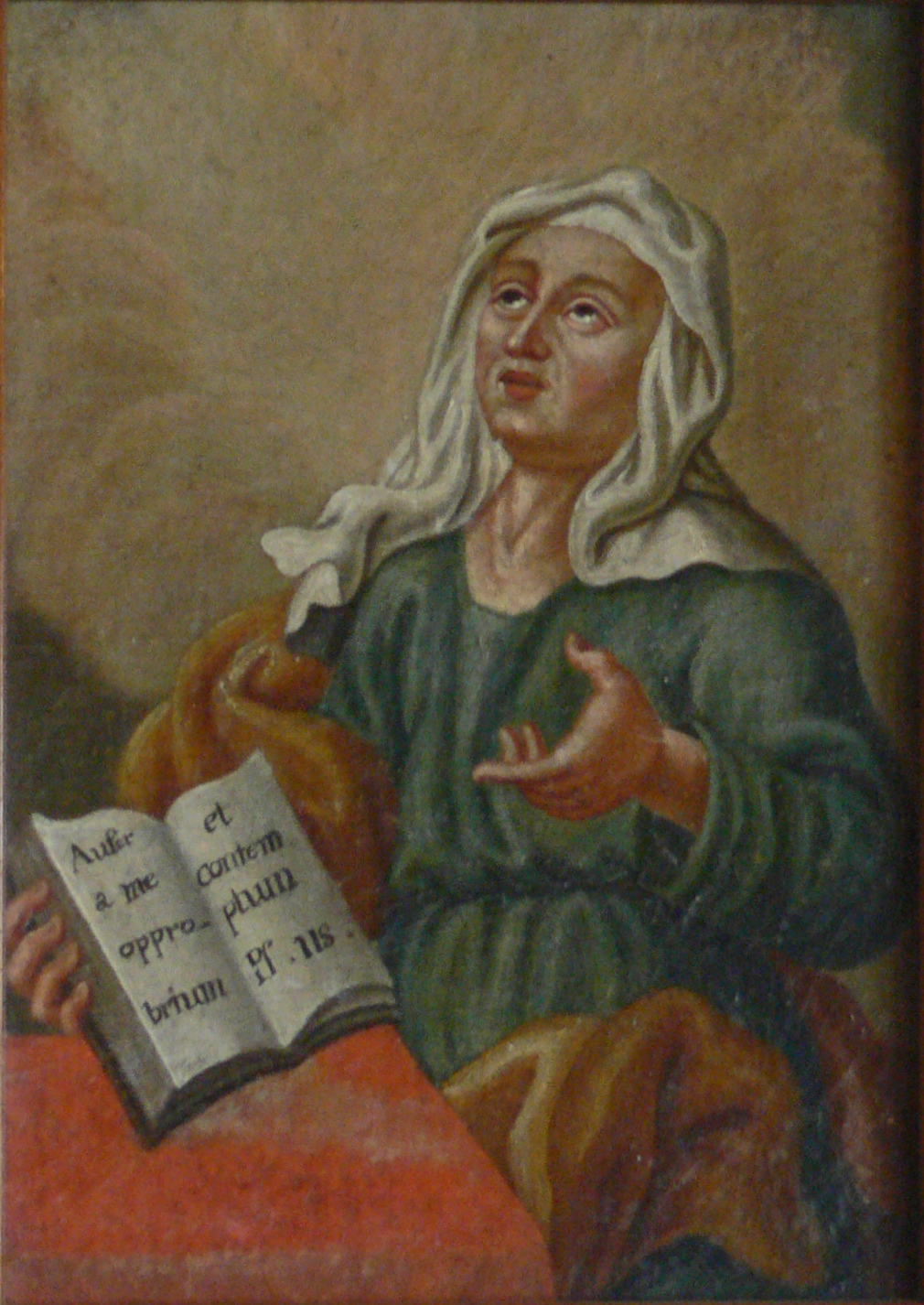
Reverse glass painting of a woman praying Psalm 119 (118):22, Aufer a me opprobrium et contemptum ("Take away from me scorn and contempt")

The Rule of Saint Benedict assigned this psalm to four minor canonical hours on Sundays and three on Mondays. The sections corresponding to the first four letters of the 22-letter Hebrew alphabet are used at Prime, the following sets of three sections at Terce, Sext and None on Sundays. The remaining sections, corresponding to the last nine letters of the Hebrew alphabet, are assigned to Terce, Sext and None on Mondays.

The 1568 Roman Breviary of Pope Pius V has Psalm 119 recited in its entirety every day: the sections corresponding to the first four letters of the Hebrew alphabet at Prime, and the others in sets of six sections each at Terce, Sext and None, respectively.

In the 1910 reform of the Roman Breviary by Pope Pius X, Psalm 119 is recited on Sundays and major feasts, divided as in the arrangement of Pius V.

Since the reform of the Roman Rite liturgy in the wake of the Second Vatican Council, the Liturgy of the Hours has a section of Psalm 119, corresponding to a single letter of the Hebrew alphabet, in the midday canonical hour on each day of the four-week cycle except on Monday of the first week (when the second half of Psalm 19 (18), which is similar in theme, is used instead) and on Friday of the third week (when the Passion Psalm 22 (21) is used). In addition, a section of Psalm 119 is used at Saturday Lauds in weeks 1 and 3, and another section at Vespers of Saturday of week 1.

In the Roman Rite Mass, portions of Psalm 119 are used a responsorial psalm on Sundays 6 and 17 of Year A of the three-year cycle of Sunday readings, on Saturday of the first week in Lent and on the third Monday in Eastertide. It is also used on five days of Year I of the two-year cycle of Ordinary Time weekday readings (Note: Wednesday and Friday of week 7, Tuesday of week 10, Thursday of week 32, Monday of week 33.) and 15 days of Year II. (Note: Saturday of week 4, Monday of week 6, Friday of week 9, Wednesday of week 12, Friday of week 13, Monday of week 18, Tuesday of week 19, Monday of week 22, Tuesday and Wednesday of week 25, Saturday of week 26, Tuesday of week 28, Friday of week 29, Friday of week 32, Friday of week 33.) A portion is also used on the feast of a Doctor of the Church.

=== Book of Common Prayer ===
In the Church of England's Book of Common Prayer, this psalm is appointed to be read in sections between the 24th and 26th days of the month. In the Daily Office lectionary of the Episcopal Church, the psalm is read in sections between the week after Easter and the week after Pentecost. The Episcopal Church's Book of Common Prayer also includes a portion of Psalm 119 as a choice for use at Noonday Prayer, a service that is based on the minor hours of Terce, Sext, and None.

=== Coptic Orthodox Church ===
In the Agpeya, the Coptic Church's book of hours, this psalm is prayed in the first watch of the Midnight office. Verses 153–176 are also in the prayer of the Veil, which is generally prayed only by monks.

== Musical settings ==
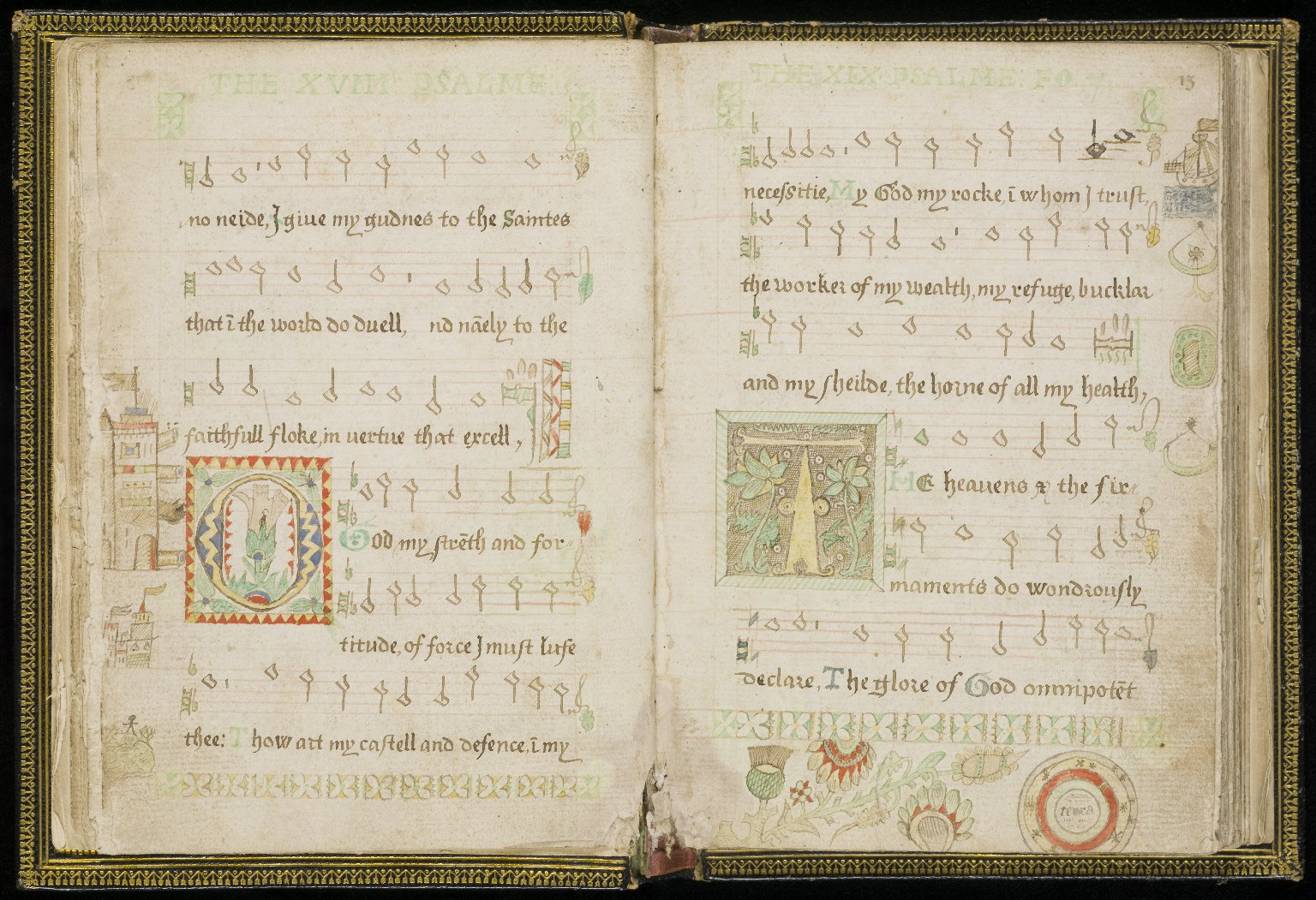
"O God, My Strength and Fortitude" in the 16th-century Scottish Psalter

- Psalm 119:1 was set to music by Charles Villiers Stanford in Three Latin Motets, Op. 38.
- Psalm 119:18 inspired the hymn Open My Eyes, That I May See by Clara H. Scott.
- Psalm 119:33–38 was set to music by William Byrd as Teach Me, O Lord.
- Psalm 119:57–64 was set to music by Robert White (composer) as Portio mea Domine.
- Psalm 119:89 is a popular Nigerian praise song.
- Psalm 119:105 was set to music by Amy Grant as "Thy Word" on the 1984 album Straight Ahead.
- Psalm 119:105–111 was set to music by Henry Purcell as "Thy word is a lantern".
- Psalm 119:1–176 was completed in 1671 by Heinrich Schütz, who also composed eight settings of metres paraphrases of sections from the psalm in German, beginning with "Wohl denen, die da leben", SWV 217 to 224, for the Becker Psalter, published first in 1628.
- Psalm 119:18, 36, and 133 as "Open Thou Mine Eyes" by John Rutter. Performed by The Cambridge Singers on "Gloria" and other albums.
- Czech composer Antonín Dvořák set verses 114, 117, 119 and 120 to music in his Biblical Songs (1894).

A complete English version of Psalm 119 from the King James Bible was completed by Frederick Steinruck, Michael Misiaszek, and Michael Owens.

In Protestant Christianity, various metrical settings of Psalm 119 have been published, including "O God, My Strength and Fortitude" by Thomas Sternhold, which appeared in the Scottish Psalter of 1564. The Psalm is put to music in The Book of Psalms for Worship, published by Crown and Covenant Publications.

== Text ==
The following table shows the Hebrew text of the Psalm with vowels, alongside the Koine Greek text in the Septuagint, the Latin text in the Vulgate and the English translation from the King James Version. Note that the meaning can slightly differ between these versions, as the Septuagint, the Vulgate and the Masoretic Text come from different textual traditions. (Note: A 1917 translation directly from Hebrew to English by the Jewish Publication Society can be found here or here, and an 1844 translation directly from the Septuagint by L. C. L. Brenton can be found here. Both translations are in the public domain.) In the Septuagint and the Vulgate, this psalm is numbered Psalm 118.

#	Hebrew	English	Greek	Latin
Aleph (א)
1	אַשְׁרֵ֥י תְמִֽימֵי־דָ֑רֶךְ הַ֝הֹלְכִ֗ים בְּתוֹרַ֥ת יְהֹוָֽה׃	Blessed are the undefiled in the way, who walk in the law of the Lord.	᾿Αλληλούϊα. - ΜΑΚΑΡΙΟΙ οἱ ἄμωμοι ἐν ὁδῷ οἱ πορευόμενοι ἐν νόμῳ Κυρίου.	ALLELUIA. Beati immaculati in via, qui ambulant in lege Domini.
2	אַ֭שְׁרֵי נֹצְרֵ֥י עֵדֹתָ֗יו בְּכׇל־לֵ֥ב יִדְרְשֽׁוּהוּ׃	Blessed are they that keep his testimonies, and that seek him with the whole heart.	μακάριοι οἱ ἐξερευνῶντες τὰ μαρτύρια αὐτοῦ· ἐν ὅλῃ καρδίᾳ ἐκζητήσουσιν αὐτόν.	Beati, qui servant testimonia eius, in toto corde exquirunt eum.
3	אַ֭ף לֹא־פָעֲל֣וּ עַוְלָ֑ה בִּדְרָכָ֥יו הָלָֽכוּ׃	They also do no iniquity: they walk in his ways.	οὐ γὰρ οἱ ἐργαζόμενοι τὴν ἀνομίαν ἐν ταῖς ὁδοῖς αὐτοῦ ἐπορεύθησαν.	Non enim operati sunt iniquitatem, in viis eius ambulaverunt.
4	אַ֭תָּה צִוִּ֥יתָה פִקֻּדֶ֗יךָ לִשְׁמֹ֥ר מְאֹֽד׃	Thou hast commanded us to keep thy precepts diligently.	σὺ ἐνετείλω τὰς ἐντολάς σου τοῦ φυλάξασθαι σφόδρα.	Tu mandasti mandata tua custodiri nimis.
5	אַ֭חֲלַי יִכֹּ֥נוּ דְרָכָ֗י לִשְׁמֹ֥ר חֻקֶּֽיךָ׃	O that my ways were directed to keep thy statutes!	ὄφελον κατευθυνθείησαν αἱ ὁδοί μου τοῦ φυλάξασθαι τὰ δικαιώματά σου.	Utinam dirigantur viae meae ad custodiendas iustificationes tuas!
6	אָ֥ז לֹא־אֵב֑וֹשׁ בְּ֝הַבִּיטִ֗י אֶל־כׇּל־מִצְוֺתֶֽיךָ׃	Then shall I not be ashamed, when I have respect unto all thy commandments.	τότε οὐ μὴ αἰσχυνθῶ ἐν τῷ με ἐπιβλέπειν ἐπὶ πάσας τὰς ἐντολάς σου.	Tunc non confundar, cum perspexero in omnibus praeceptis tuis.
7	א֭וֹדְךָ בְּיֹ֣שֶׁר לֵבָ֑ב בְּ֝לׇמְדִ֗י מִשְׁפְּטֵ֥י צִדְקֶֽךָ׃	I will praise thee with uprightness of heart, when I shall have learned thy righteous judgments.	ἐξομολογήσομαί σοι ἐν εὐθύτητι καρδίας ἐν τῷ μεμαθηκέναι με τὰ κρίματα τῆς δικαιοσύνης σου.	Confitebor tibi in directione cordis, in eo quod didici iudicia iustitiae tuae.
8	אֶת־חֻקֶּ֥יךָ אֶשְׁמֹ֑ר אַֽל־תַּעַזְבֵ֥נִי עַד־מְאֹֽד׃	I will keep thy statutes: O forsake me not utterly.	τὰ δικαιώματά σου φυλάξω· μή με ἐγκαταλίπῃς ἕως σφόδρα.	Iustificationes tuas custodiam, non me derelinquas usquequaque.
Beth (ב)
9	בַּמֶּ֣ה יְזַכֶּה־נַּ֭עַר אֶת־אׇרְח֑וֹ לִ֝שְׁמֹ֗ר כִּדְבָרֶֽךָ׃	Wherewithal shall a young man cleanse his way? by taking heed thereto according to thy word.	᾿Εν τίνι κατορθώσει νεώτερος τὴν ὁδὸν αὐτοῦ; ἐν τῷ φυλάξασθαι τοὺς λόγους σου.	In quo mundabit adulescentior viam suam? In custodiendo sermones tuos.
10	בְּכׇל־לִבִּ֥י דְרַשְׁתִּ֑יךָ אַל־תַּ֝שְׁגֵּ֗נִי מִמִּצְוֺתֶֽיךָ׃	With my whole heart have I sought thee: O let me not wander from thy commandments.	ἐν ὅλῃ καρδίᾳ μου ἐξεζήτησά σε· μὴ ἀπώσῃ με ἀπὸ τῶν ἐντολῶν σου.	In toto corde meo exquisivi te; ne errare me facias a praeceptis tuis.
11	בְּ֭לִבִּי צָפַ֣נְתִּי אִמְרָתֶ֑ךָ לְ֝מַ֗עַן לֹ֣א אֶחֱטָא־לָֽךְ׃	Thy word have I hid in mine heart, that I might not sin against thee.	ἐν τῇ καρδίᾳ μου ἔκρυψα τὰ λόγιά σου, ὅπως ἂν μὴ ἁμάρτω σοι.	In corde meo abscondi eloquia tua, ut non peccem tibi.
12	בָּר֖וּךְ אַתָּ֥ה יְהֹוָ֗ה לַמְּדֵ֥נִי חֻקֶּֽיךָ׃	Blessed art thou, O Lord: teach me thy statutes.	εὐλογητὸς εἶ, Κύριε· δίδαξόν με τὰ δικαιώματά σου.	Benedictus es, Domine; doce me iustificationes tuas.
13	בִּשְׂפָתַ֥י סִפַּ֑רְתִּי כֹּ֝֗ל מִשְׁפְּטֵי־פִֽיךָ׃	With my lips have I declared all the judgments of thy mouth.	ἐν τοῖς χείλεσί μου ἐξήγγειλα πάντα τὰ κρίματα τοῦ στόματός σου.	In labiis meis numeravi omnia iudicia oris tui.
14	בְּדֶ֖רֶךְ עֵדְוֺתֶ֥יךָ שַּׂ֗שְׂתִּי כְּעַ֣ל כׇּל־הֽוֹן׃	I have rejoiced in the way of thy testimonies, as much as in all riches.	ἐν τῇ ὁδῷ τῶν μαρτυρίων σου ἐτέρφθην ὡς ἐπὶ παντὶ πλούτῳ.	In via testimoniorum tuorum delectatus sum sicut in omnibus divitiis.
15	בְּפִקּוּדֶ֥יךָ אָשִׂ֑יחָה וְ֝אַבִּ֗יטָה אֹֽרְחֹתֶֽיךָ׃	I will meditate in thy precepts, and have respect unto thy ways.	ἐν ταῖς ἐντολαῖς σου ἀδολεσχήσω καὶ κατανοήσω τὰς ὁδούς σου.	In mandatis tuis exercebor et considerabo vias tuas.
16	בְּחֻקֹּתֶ֥יךָ אֶֽשְׁתַּעֲשָׁ֑ע לֹ֖א אֶשְׁכַּ֣ח דְּבָרֶֽךָ׃	I will delight myself in thy statutes: I will not forget thy word.	ἐν τοῖς δικαιώμασί σου μελετήσω, οὐκ ἐπιλήσομαι τῶν λόγων σου.	In iustificationibus tuis delectabor, non obliviscar sermonem tuum.
Gimel (ג)
17	גְּמֹ֖ל עַל־עַבְדְּךָ֥ אֶחְיֶ֗ה וְאֶשְׁמְרָ֥ה דְבָרֶֽךָ׃	Deal bountifully with thy servant, that I may live, and keep thy word.	᾿Ανταπόδος τῷ δούλῳ σου· ζήσομαι καὶ φυλάξω τοὺς λόγους σου.	Benefac servo tuo, et vivam et custodiam sermonem tuum.
18	גַּל־עֵינַ֥י וְאַבִּ֑יטָה נִ֝פְלָא֗וֹת מִתּוֹרָתֶֽךָ׃	Open thou mine eyes, that I may behold wondrous things out of thy law.	ἀποκάλυψον τοὺς ὀφθαλμούς μου, καὶ κατανοήσω τὰ θαυμάσια ἐκ τοῦ νόμου σου.	Revela oculos meos, et considerabo mirabilia de lege tua.
19	גֵּ֣ר אָנֹכִ֣י בָאָ֑רֶץ אַל־תַּסְתֵּ֥ר מִ֝מֶּ֗נִּי מִצְוֺתֶֽיךָ׃	I am a stranger in the earth: hide not thy commandments from me.	πάροικος ἐγώ εἰμι ἐν τῇ γῇ· μὴ ἀποκρύψῃς ἀπ᾿ ἐμοῦ τὰς ἐντολάς σου.	Incola ego sum in terra, non abscondas a me praecepta tua.
20	גָּרְסָ֣ה נַפְשִׁ֣י לְתַאֲבָ֑ה אֶֽל־מִשְׁפָּטֶ֥יךָ בְכׇל־עֵֽת׃	My soul breaketh for the longing that it hath unto thy judgments at all times.	ἐπεπόθησεν ἡ ψυχή μου τοῦ ἐπιθυμῆσαι τὰ κρίματά σου ἐν παντὶ καιρῷ.	Defecit anima mea in desiderando iudicia tua in omni tempore.
21	גָּ֭עַרְתָּ זֵדִ֣ים אֲרוּרִ֑ים הַ֝שֹּׁגִ֗ים מִמִּצְוֺתֶֽיךָ׃	Thou hast rebuked the proud that are cursed, which do err from thy commandments.	ἐπετίμησας ὑπερηφάνοις· ἐπικατάρατοι οἱ ἐκκλίνοντες ἀπὸ τῶν ἐντολῶν σου.	Increpasti superbos; maledicti, qui errant a praeceptis tuis.
22	גַּ֣ל מֵ֭עָלַי חֶרְפָּ֣ה וָב֑וּז כִּ֖י עֵדֹתֶ֣יךָ נָצָֽרְתִּי׃	Remove from me reproach and contempt; for I have kept thy testimonies.	περίελε ἀπ᾿ ἐμοῦ ὄνειδος καὶ ἐξουδένωσιν, ὅτι τὰ μαρτύριά σου ἐξεζήτησα.	Aufer a me opprobrium et contemptum, quia testimonia tua servavi.
23	גַּ֤ם יָשְׁב֣וּ שָׂ֭רִים בִּ֣י נִדְבָּ֑רוּ עַ֝בְדְּךָ֗ יָשִׂ֥יחַ בְּחֻקֶּֽיךָ׃	Princes also did sit and speak against me: but thy servant did meditate in thy statutes.	καὶ γὰρ ἐκάθισαν ἄρχοντες καὶ κατ᾿ ἐμοῦ κατελάλουν, ὁ δὲ δοῦλός σου ἠδολέσχει ἐν τοῖς δικαιώμασί σου.	Etsi principes sedent et adversum me loquuntur, servus tamen tuus exercetur in iustificationibus tuis.
24	גַּֽם־עֵ֭דֹתֶיךָ שַׁעֲשֻׁעָ֗י אַנְשֵׁ֥י עֲצָתִֽי׃	Thy testimonies also are my delight and my counselors.	καὶ γὰρ τὰ μαρτύριά σου μελέτη μού ἐστι, καὶ αἱ συμβουλίαι μου τὰ δικαιώματά σου.	Nam et testimonia tua delectatio mea, et consilium meum iustificationes tuae.
Daleth (ד)
25	דָּבְקָ֣ה לֶעָפָ֣ר נַפְשִׁ֑י חַ֝יֵּ֗נִי כִּדְבָרֶֽךָ׃	My soul cleaveth unto the dust: quicken thou me according to thy word.	᾿Εκολλήθη τῷ ἐδάφει ἡ ψυχή μου· ζῆσόν με κατὰ τὸν λόγον σου.	Adhaesit pulveri anima mea; vivifica me secundum verbum tuum.
26	דְּרָכַ֣י סִ֭פַּרְתִּי וַֽתַּעֲנֵ֗נִי לַמְּדֵ֥נִי חֻקֶּֽיךָ׃	I have declared my ways, and thou heardest me: teach me thy statutes.	τὰς ὁδούς μου ἐξήγγειλα, καὶ ἐπήκουσάς μου· δίδαξόν με τὰ δικαιώματά σου.	Vias meas enuntiavi, et exaudisti me; doce me iustificationes tuas.
27	דֶּרֶךְ־פִּקּוּדֶ֥יךָ הֲבִינֵ֑נִי וְ֝אָשִׂ֗יחָה בְּנִפְלְאוֹתֶֽיךָ׃	Make me to understand the way of thy precepts: so shall I talk of thy wondrous works.	ὁδὸν δικαιωμάτων σου συνέτισόν με, καὶ ἀδολεσχήσω ἐν τοῖς θαυμασίοις σου.	Viam mandatorum tuorum fac me intellegere, et exercebor in mirabilibus tuis.
28	דָּלְפָ֣ה נַ֭פְשִׁי מִתּוּגָ֑ה קַ֝יְּמֵ֗נִי כִּדְבָרֶֽךָ׃	My soul melteth for heaviness: strengthen thou me according unto thy word.	ἐνύσταξεν ἡ ψυχή μου ἀπὸ ἀκηδίας· βεβαίωσόν με ἐν τοῖς λόγοις σου.	Lacrimata est anima mea prae maerore; erige me secundum verbum tuum.
29	דֶּֽרֶךְ־שֶׁ֭קֶר הָסֵ֣ר מִמֶּ֑נִּי וְֽתוֹרָתְךָ֥ חׇנֵּֽנִי׃	Remove from me the way of lying: and grant me thy law graciously.	ὁδὸν ἀδικίας ἀπόστησον ἀπ᾿ ἐμοῦ καὶ τῷ νόμῳ σου ἐλέησόν με.	Viam mendacii averte a me et legem tuam da mihi benigne.
30	דֶּֽרֶךְ־אֱמוּנָ֥ה בָחָ֑רְתִּי מִשְׁפָּטֶ֥יךָ שִׁוִּֽיתִי׃	I have chosen the way of truth: thy judgments have I laid before me.	ὁδὸν ἀληθείας ᾑρετισάμην καὶ τὰ κρίματά σου οὐκ ἐπελαθόμην.	Viam veritatis elegi, iudicia tua proposui mihi.
31	דָּבַ֥קְתִּי בְעֵדְוֺתֶ֑יךָ יְ֝הֹוָ֗ה אַל־תְּבִישֵֽׁנִי׃	I have stuck unto thy testimonies: O Lord, put me not to shame.	ἐκολλήθην τοῖς μαρτυρίοις σου, Κύριε· μή με καταισχύνῃς.	Adhaesi testimoniis tuis, Domine; noli me confundere.
32	דֶּֽרֶךְ־מִצְוֺתֶ֥יךָ אָר֑וּץ כִּ֖י תַרְחִ֣יב לִבִּֽי׃	I will run the way of thy commandments, when thou shalt enlarge my heart.	ὁδὸν ἐντολῶν σου ἔδραμον, ὅταν ἐπλάτυνας τὴν καρδίαν μου.	Viam mandatorum tuorum curram, quia dilatasti cor meum.
He (ה)
33	הוֹרֵ֣נִי יְ֭הֹוָה דֶּ֥רֶךְ חֻקֶּ֗יךָ וְאֶצְּרֶ֥נָּה עֵֽקֶב׃	Teach me, O Lord, the way of thy statutes; and I shall keep it unto the end.	Νομοθέτησόν με, Κύριε, τὴν ὁδὸν τῶν δικαιωμάτων σου, καὶ ἐκζητήσω αὐτὴν διαπαντός.	Legem pone mihi, Domine, viam iustificationum tuarum, et servabo eam semper.
34	הֲ֭בִינֵנִי וְאֶצְּרָ֥ה תוֹרָתֶ֗ךָ וְאֶשְׁמְרֶ֥נָּה בְכׇל־לֵֽב׃	Give me understanding, and I shall keep thy law; yea, I shall observe it with my whole heart.	συνέτισόν με, καὶ ἐξερευνήσω τὸν νόμον σου καὶ φυλάξω αὐτὸν ἐν ὅλῃ καρδίᾳ μου.	Da mihi intellectum, et servabo legem tuam et custodiam illam in toto corde meo.
35	הַ֭דְרִיכֵנִי בִּנְתִ֣יב מִצְוֺתֶ֑יךָ כִּי־ב֥וֹ חָפָֽצְתִּי׃	Make me to go in the path of thy commandments; for therein do I delight.	ὁδήγησόν με ἐν τῇ τρίβῳ τῶν ἐντολῶν σου, ὅτι αὐτὴν ἠθέλησα.	Deduc me in semitam praeceptorum tuorum, quia ipsam volui.
36	הַט־לִ֭בִּי אֶל־עֵדְוֺתֶ֗יךָ וְאַ֣ל אֶל־בָּֽצַע׃	Incline my heart unto thy testimonies, and not to covetousness.	κλῖνον τὴν καρδίαν μου εἰς τὰ μαρτύριά σου καὶ μὴ εἰς πλεονεξίαν.	Inclina cor meum in testimonia tua et non in avaritiam.
37	הַעֲבֵ֣ר עֵ֭ינַי מֵרְא֣וֹת שָׁ֑וְא בִּדְרָכֶ֥ךָ חַיֵּֽנִי׃	Turn away mine eyes from beholding vanity; and quicken thou me in thy way.	ἀπόστρεψον τοὺς ὀφθαλμούς μου τοῦ μὴ ἰδεῖν ματαιότητα, ἐν τῇ ὁδῷ σου ζῆσόν με.	Averte oculos meos, ne videant vanitatem; in via tua vivifica me.
38	הָקֵ֣ם לְ֭עַבְדְּךָ אִמְרָתֶ֑ךָ אֲ֝שֶׁ֗ר לְיִרְאָתֶֽךָ׃	Stablish thy word unto thy servant, who is devoted to thy fear.	στῆσον τῷ δούλῳ σου τὸ λόγιόν σου εἰς τὸν φόβον σου.	Suscita servo tuo eloquium tuum, quod est ad timorem tuum.
39	הַעֲבֵ֣ר חֶ֭רְפָּתִי אֲשֶׁ֣ר יָגֹ֑רְתִּי כִּ֖י מִשְׁפָּטֶ֣יךָ טוֹבִֽים׃	Turn away my reproach which I fear: for thy judgments are good.	περίελε τὸν ὀνειδισμόν μου, ὃν ὑπώπτευσα· ὅτι τὰ κρίματά σου χρηστά.	Amove opprobrium meum, quod suspicatus sum, quia iudicia tua iucunda.
40	הִ֭נֵּה תָּאַ֣בְתִּי לְפִקֻּדֶ֑יךָ בְּצִדְקָתְךָ֥ חַיֵּֽנִי׃	Behold, I have longed after thy precepts: quicken me in thy righteousness.	ἰδοὺ ἐπεθύμησα τὰς ἐντολάς σου· ἐν τῇ δικαιοσύνῃ σου ζῆσόν με.	Ecce concupivi mandata tua; in iustitia tua vivifica me.
Vau (ו)
41	וִיבֹאֻ֣נִי חֲסָדֶ֣ךָ יְהֹוָ֑ה תְּ֝שׁ֥וּעָתְךָ֗ כְּאִמְרָתֶֽךָ׃	Let thy mercies come also unto me, O Lord, even thy salvation, according to thy word.	Καὶ ἔλθοι ἐπ᾿ ἐμὲ τὸ ἔλεός σου, Κύριε, τὸ σωτήριόν σου κατὰ τὸν λόγον σου.	Et veniat super me misericordia tua, Domine, salutare tuum secundum eloquium tuum.
42	וְאֶעֱנֶ֣ה חֹרְפִ֣י דָבָ֑ר כִּֽי־בָ֝טַ֗חְתִּי בִּדְבָרֶֽךָ׃	So shall I have wherewith to answer him that reproacheth me: for I trust in thy word.	καὶ ἀποκριθήσομαι τοῖς ὀνειδίζουσί μοι λόγον, ὅτι ἤλπισα ἐπὶ τοῖς λόγοις σου.	Et respondebo exprobrantibus mihi verbum, quia speravi in sermonibus tuis.
43	וְֽאַל־תַּצֵּ֬ל מִפִּ֣י דְבַר־אֱמֶ֣ת עַד־מְאֹ֑ד כִּ֖י לְמִשְׁפָּטֶ֣ךָ יִחָֽלְתִּי׃	And take not the word of truth utterly out of my mouth; for I have hoped in thy judgments.	καὶ μὴ περιέλῃς ἐκ τοῦ στόματός μου λόγον ἀληθείας ἕως σφόδρα, ὅτι ἐπὶ τοῖς κρίμασί σου ἐπήλπισα.	Et ne auferas de ore meo verbum veritatis usquequaque, quia in iudiciis tuis supersperavi.
44	וְאֶשְׁמְרָ֖ה תוֹרָתְךָ֥ תָמִ֗יד לְעוֹלָ֥ם וָעֶֽד׃	So shall I keep thy law continually for ever and ever.	καὶ φυλάξω τὸν νόμον σου διαπαντός, εἰς τὸν αἰῶνα καὶ εἰς τὸν αἰῶνα τοῦ αἰῶνος.	Et custodiam legem tuam semper, in saeculum et in saeculum saeculi.
45	וְאֶתְהַלְּכָ֥ה בָרְחָבָ֑ה כִּ֖י פִקֻּדֶ֣יךָ דָרָֽשְׁתִּי׃	And I will walk at liberty: for I seek thy precepts.	καὶ ἐπορευόμην ἐν πλατυσμῷ, ὅτι τὰς ἐντολάς σου ἐξεζήτησα.	Et ambulabo in latitudine, quia mandata tua exquisivi.
46	וַאֲדַבְּרָ֣ה בְ֭עֵדֹתֶיךָ נֶ֥גֶד מְלָכִ֗ים וְלֹ֣א אֵבֽוֹשׁ׃	I will speak of thy testimonies also before kings, and will not be ashamed.	καὶ ἐλάλουν ἐν τοῖς μαρτυρίοις σου ἐναντίον βασιλέων καὶ οὐκ ᾐσχυνόμην.	Et loquar de testimoniis tuis in conspectu regum et non confundar.
47	וְאֶשְׁתַּעֲשַׁ֥ע בְּמִצְוֺתֶ֗יךָ אֲשֶׁ֣ר אָהָֽבְתִּי׃	And I will delight myself in thy commandments, which I have loved.	καὶ ἐμελέτων ἐν ταῖς ἐντολαῖς σου, ἃς ἠγάπησα σφόδρα.	Et delectabor in praeceptis tuis, quae dilexi.
48	וְאֶשָּֽׂא־כַפַּ֗י אֶֽל־מִ֭צְוֺתֶיךָ אֲשֶׁ֥ר אָהָ֗בְתִּי וְאָשִׂ֥יחָה בְחֻקֶּֽיךָ׃	My hands also will I lift up unto thy commandments, which I have loved; and I will meditate in thy statutes.	καὶ ἦρα τὰς χεῖράς μου πρὸς τὰς ἐντολάς σου ἃς ἠγάπησα, καὶ ἠδολέσχουν ἐν τοῖς δικαιώμασί σου.	Et levabo manus meas ad praecepta tua, quae dilexi; et exercebor in iustificationibus tuis. -
Zain (ז)
49	זְכֹר־דָּבָ֥ר לְעַבְדֶּ֑ךָ עַ֝֗ל אֲשֶׁ֣ר יִֽחַלְתָּֽנִי׃	Remember the word unto thy servant, upon which thou hast caused me to hope.	Μνήσθητι τῶν λόγων σου τῷ δούλῳ σου, ὧν ἐπήλπισάς με.	Memor esto verbi tui servo tuo, in quo mihi spem dedisti.
50	זֹ֣את נֶחָמָתִ֣י בְעׇנְיִ֑י כִּ֖י אִמְרָתְךָ֣ חִיָּֽתְנִי׃	This is my comfort in my affliction: for thy word hath quickened me.	αὕτη με παρεκάλεσεν ἐν τῇ ταπεινώσει μου, ὅτι τὸ λόγιόν σου ἔζησέ με.	Hoc me consolatum est in humiliatione mea, quia eloquium tuum vivificavit me.
51	זֵ֭דִים הֱלִיצֻ֣נִי עַד־מְאֹ֑ד מִ֝תּ֥וֹרָתְךָ֗ לֹ֣א נָטִֽיתִי׃	The proud have had me greatly in derision: yet have I not declined from thy law.	ὑπερήφανοι παρηνόμουν ἕως σφόδρα, ἀπὸ δὲ τοῦ νόμου σου οὐκ ἐξέκλινα.	Superbi deriserunt me vehementer; a lege autem tua non declinavi.
52	זָ֘כַ֤רְתִּי מִשְׁפָּטֶ֖יךָ מֵעוֹלָ֥ם ׀ יְהֹוָ֗ה וָאֶתְנֶחָֽם׃	I remembered thy judgments of old, O Lord; and have comforted myself.	ἐμνήσθην τῶν κριμάτων σου ἀπ᾿ αἰῶνος, Κύριε, καὶ παρεκλήθην.	Memor fui iudiciorum tuorum a saeculo, Domine, et consolatus sum.
53	זַלְעָפָ֣ה אֲ֭חָזַתְנִי מֵרְשָׁעִ֑ים עֹ֝זְבֵ֗י תּֽוֹרָתֶֽךָ׃	Horror hath taken hold upon me because of the wicked that forsake thy law.	ἀθυμία κατέσχε με ἀπὸ ἁμαρτωλῶν τῶν ἐγκαταλιμπανόντων τὸν νόμον σου.	Indignatio tenuit me propter peccatores derelinquentes legem tuam.
54	זְ֭מִרוֹת הָיוּ־לִ֥י חֻקֶּ֗יךָ בְּבֵ֣ית מְגוּרָֽי׃	Thy statutes have been my songs in the house of my pilgrimage.	ψαλτὰ ἦσάν μοι τὰ δικαιώματά σου ἐν τόπῳ παροικίας μου.	Cantica factae sunt mihi iustificationes tuae in loco peregrinationis meae.
55	זָ֘כַ֤רְתִּי בַלַּ֣יְלָה שִׁמְךָ֣ יְהֹוָ֑ה וָ֝אֶשְׁמְרָ֗ה תּֽוֹרָתֶֽךָ׃	I have remembered thy name, O Lord, in the night, and have kept thy law.	ἐμνήσθην ἐν νυκτὶ τοῦ ὀνόματός σου, Κύριε, καὶ ἐφύλαξα τὸν νόμον σου.	Memor fui nocte nominis tui, Domine, et custodiam legem tuam.
56	זֹ֥את הָיְתָה־לִּ֑י כִּ֖י פִקֻּדֶ֣יךָ נָצָֽרְתִּי׃	This I had, because I kept thy precepts.	αὕτη ἐγενήθη μοι, ὅτι τὰ δικαιώματά σου ἐξεζήτησα.	Hoc factum est mihi, quia mandata tua servavi.
Cheth (ח)
57	חֶלְקִ֖י יְהֹוָ֥ה אָמַ֗רְתִּי לִשְׁמֹ֥ר דְּבָרֶֽיךָ׃	Thou art my portion, O Lord: I have said that I would keep thy words.	Μερίς μου εἶ, Κύριε, εἶπα τοῦ φυλάξασθαι τὸν νόμον σου.	Portio mea Dominus: dixi custodire verba tua.
58	חִלִּ֣יתִי פָנֶ֣יךָ בְכׇל־לֵ֑ב חׇ֝נֵּ֗נִי כְּאִמְרָתֶֽךָ׃	I intreated thy favour with my whole heart: be merciful unto me according to thy word.	ἐδεήθην τοῦ προσώπου σου ἐν ὅλῃ καρδίᾳ μου· ἐλέησόν με κατὰ τὸ λόγιόν σου.	Deprecatus sum faciem tuam in toto corde meo; miserere mei secundum eloquium tuum.
59	חִשַּׁ֥בְתִּי דְרָכָ֑י וָאָשִׁ֥יבָה רַ֝גְלַ֗י אֶל־עֵדֹתֶֽיךָ׃	I thought on my ways, and turned my feet unto thy testimonies.	διελογισάμην τὰς ὁδούς σου καὶ ἐπέστρεψα τοὺς πόδας μου εἰς τὰ μαρτύριά σου.	Cogitavi vias meas et converti pedes meos in testimonia tua.
60	חַ֭שְׁתִּי וְלֹ֣א הִתְמַהְמָ֑הְתִּי לִ֝שְׁמֹ֗ר מִצְוֺתֶֽיךָ׃	I made haste, and delayed not to keep thy commandments.	ἡτοιμάσθην καὶ οὐκ ἐταράχθην τοῦ φυλάξασθαι τὰς ἐντολάς σου.	Festinavi et non sum moratus, ut custodiam praecepta tua.
61	חֶבְלֵ֣י רְשָׁעִ֣ים עִוְּדֻ֑נִי תּ֥֝וֹרָתְךָ֗ לֹ֣א שָׁכָֽחְתִּי׃	The bands of the wicked have robbed me: but I have not forgotten thy law.	σχοινία ἁμαρτωλῶν περιεπλάκησάν μοι, καὶ τοῦ νόμου σου οὐκ ἐπελαθόμην.	Funes peccatorum circumplexi sunt me, et legem tuam non sum oblitus.
62	חֲצֽוֹת־לַ֗יְלָה אָ֭קוּם לְהוֹד֣וֹת לָ֑ךְ עַ֝֗ל מִשְׁפְּטֵ֥י צִדְקֶֽךָ׃	At midnight I will rise to give thanks unto thee because of thy righteous judgments.	μεσονύκτιον ἐξηγειρόμην τοῦ ἐξομολογεῖσθαί σοι ἐπὶ τὰ κρίματα τῆς δικαιοσύνης σου.	Media nocte surgebam ad confitendum tibi super iudicia iustitiae tuae.
63	חָבֵ֣ר אָ֭נִי לְכׇל־אֲשֶׁ֣ר יְרֵא֑וּךָ וּ֝לְשֹׁמְרֵ֗י פִּקּוּדֶֽיךָ׃	I am a companion of all them that fear thee, and of them that keep thy precepts.	μέτοχος ἐγώ εἰμι πάντων τῶν φοβουμένων σε καὶ τῶν φυλασσόντων τὰς ἐντολάς σου.	Particeps ego sum omnium timentium te et custodientium mandata tua.
64	חַסְדְּךָ֣ יְ֭הֹוָה מָלְאָ֥ה הָאָ֗רֶץ חֻקֶּ֥יךָ לַמְּדֵֽנִי׃	The earth, O Lord, is full of thy mercy: teach me thy statutes.	τοῦ ἐλέους σου, Κύριε, πλήρης ἡ γῆ· τὰ δικαιώματά σου δίδαξόν με.	Misericordia tua, Domine, plena est terra; iustificationes tuas doce me.
Teth (ט)
65	ט֭וֹב עָשִׂ֣יתָ עִֽם־עַבְדְּךָ֑ יְ֝הֹוָ֗ה כִּדְבָרֶֽךָ׃	Thou hast dealt well with thy servant, O Lord, according unto thy word.	Χρηστότητα ἐποίησας μετὰ τοῦ δούλου σου, Κύριε, κατὰ τὸν λόγον σου.	Bonitatem fecisti cum servo tuo, Domine, secundum verbum tuum.
66	ט֤וּב טַ֣עַם וָדַ֣עַת לַמְּדֵ֑נִי כִּ֖י בְמִצְוֺתֶ֣יךָ הֶאֱמָֽנְתִּי׃	Teach me good judgment and knowledge: for I have believed thy commandments.	χρηστότητα καὶ παιδείαν καὶ γνῶσιν δίδαξόν με, ὅτι ταῖς ἐντολαῖς σου ἐπίστευσα.	Bonitatem et prudentiam et scientiam doce me, quia praeceptis tuis credidi.
67	טֶ֣רֶם אֶ֭עֱנֶה אֲנִ֣י שֹׁגֵ֑ג וְ֝עַתָּ֗ה אִמְרָתְךָ֥ שָׁמָֽרְתִּי׃	Before I was afflicted I went astray: but now have I kept thy word.	πρὸ τοῦ με ταπεινωθῆναι ἐγὼ ἐπλημμέλησα, διὰ τοῦτο τὸ λόγιόν σου ἐφύλαξα.	Priusquam humiliarer ego erravi; nunc autem eloquium tuum custodiam.
68	טוֹב־אַתָּ֥ה וּמֵטִ֗יב לַמְּדֵ֥נִי חֻקֶּֽיךָ׃	Thou art good, and doest good; teach me thy statutes.	χρηστὸς εἶ σύ, Κύριε, καὶ ἐν τῇ χρηστότητί σου δίδαξόν με τὰ δικαιώματά σου.	Bonus es tu et benefaciens, doce me iustificationes tuas.
69	טָפְל֬וּ עָלַ֣י שֶׁ֣קֶר זֵדִ֑ים אֲ֝נִ֗י בְּכׇל־לֵ֤ב ׀ אֶצֹּ֬ר פִּקּוּדֶֽיךָ׃	The proud have forged a lie against me: but I will keep thy precepts with my whole heart.	ἐπληθύνθη ἐπ᾿ ἐμὲ ἀδικία ὑπερηφάνων, ἐγὼ δὲ ἐν ὅλῃ καρδίᾳ μου ἐξερευνήσω τὰς ἐντολάς σου.	Excogitaverunt contra me dolosa superbi, ego autem in toto corde meo servabo mandata tua.
70	טָפַ֣שׁ כַּחֵ֣לֶב לִבָּ֑ם אֲ֝נִ֗י תּוֹרָתְךָ֥ שִׁעֲשָֽׁעְתִּי׃	Their heart is as fat as grease; but I delight in thy law.	ἐτυρώθη ὡς γάλα ἡ καρδία αὐτῶν, ἐγὼ δὲ τὸν νόμον σου ἐμελέτησα.	Incrassatum est sicut adeps cor eorum, ego vero in lege tua delectatus sum.
71	טֽוֹב־לִ֥י כִֽי־עֻנֵּ֑יתִי לְ֝מַ֗עַן אֶלְמַ֥ד חֻקֶּֽיךָ׃	It is good for me that I have been afflicted; that I might learn thy statutes.	ἀγαθόν μοι ὅτι ἐταπείνωσάς με, ὅπως ἂν μάθω τὰ δικαιώματά σου.	Bonum mihi quia humiliatus sum, ut discam iustificationes tuas.
72	טֽוֹב־לִ֥י תוֹרַת־פִּ֑יךָ מֵ֝אַלְפֵ֗י זָהָ֥ב וָכָֽסֶף׃	The law of thy mouth is better unto me than thousands of gold and silver.	ἀγαθός μοι ὁ νόμος τοῦ στόματός σου ὑπὲρ χιλιάδας χρυσίου καὶ ἀργυρίου.	Bonum mihi lex oris tui super milia auri et argenti.
Jod (י)
73	יָדֶ֣יךָ עָ֭שׂוּנִי וַֽיְכוֹנְנ֑וּנִי הֲ֝בִינֵ֗נִי וְאֶלְמְדָ֥ה מִצְוֺתֶֽיךָ׃	Thy hands have made me and fashioned me: give me understanding, that I may learn thy commandments.	Αἱ χεῖρές σου ἐποίησάν με καὶ ἔπλασάν με· συνέτισόν με καὶ μαθήσομαι τὰς ἐντολάς σου.	Manus tuae fecerunt me et plasmaverunt me; da mihi intellectum, et discam praecepta tua.
74	יְ֭רֵאֶיךָ יִרְא֣וּנִי וְיִשְׂמָ֑חוּ כִּ֖י לִדְבָרְךָ֣ יִחָֽלְתִּי׃	They that fear thee will be glad when they see me; because I have hoped in thy word.	οἱ φοβούμενοί σε ὄψονταί με καὶ εὐφρανθήσονται, ὅτι εἰς τοὺς λόγους σου ἐπήλπισα.	Qui timent te, videbunt me et laetabuntur, quia in verba tua supersperavi.
75	יָדַ֣עְתִּי יְ֭הֹוָה כִּי־צֶ֣דֶק מִשְׁפָּטֶ֑יךָ וֶ֝אֱמוּנָ֗ה עִנִּיתָֽנִי׃	I know, O Lord, that thy judgments are right, and that thou in faithfulness hast afflicted me.	ἔγνων, Κύριε, ὅτι δικαιοσύνη τὰ κρίματά σου, καὶ ἀληθείᾳ ἐταπείνωσάς με.	Cognovi, Domine, quia aequitas iudicia tua, et in veritate humiliasti me.
76	יְהִי־נָ֣א חַסְדְּךָ֣ לְנַחֲמֵ֑נִי כְּאִמְרָתְךָ֥ לְעַבְדֶּֽךָ׃	Let, I pray thee, thy merciful kindness be for my comfort, according to thy word unto thy servant.	γενηθήτω δὴ τὸ ἔλεός σου τοῦ παρακαλέσαι με κατὰ τὸ λόγιόν σου τῷ δούλῳ σου.	Fiat misericordia tua, ut consoletur me, secundum eloquium tuum servo tuo.
77	יְבֹא֣וּנִי רַחֲמֶ֣יךָ וְאֶחְיֶ֑ה כִּי־ת֥֝וֹרָתְךָ֗ שַׁעֲשֻׁעָֽי׃	Let thy tender mercies come unto me, that I may live: for thy law is my delight.	ἐλθέτωσάν μοι οἱ οἰκτιρμοί σου, καὶ ζήσομαι, ὅτι ὁ νόμος σου μελέτη μού ἐστιν.	Veniant mihi miserationes tuae, et vivam, quia lex tua delectatio mea est.
78	יֵבֹ֣שׁוּ זֵ֭דִים כִּי־שֶׁ֣קֶר עִוְּת֑וּנִי אֲ֝נִ֗י אָשִׂ֥יחַ בְּפִקּוּדֶֽיךָ׃	Let the proud be ashamed; for they dealt perversely with me without a cause: but I will meditate in thy precepts.	αἰσχυνθήτωσαν ὑπερήφανοι, ὅτι ἀδίκως ἠνόμησαν εἰς ἐμέ· ἐγὼ δὲ ἀδολεσχήσω ἐν ταῖς ἐντολαῖς σου.	Confundantur superbi, quoniam dolose incurvaverunt me, ego autem exercebor in mandatis tuis.
79	יָשׁ֣וּבוּ לִ֣י יְרֵאֶ֑יךָ (וידעו) [וְ֝יֹדְעֵ֗י] עֵדֹתֶֽיךָ׃	Let those that fear thee turn unto me, and those that have known thy testimonies.	ἐπιστρεψάτωσάν με οἱ φοβούμενοί σε καὶ οἱ γινώσκοντες τὰ μαρτύριά σου.	Convertantur mihi timentes te, et qui noverunt testimonia tua.
80	יְהִי־לִבִּ֣י תָמִ֣ים בְּחֻקֶּ֑יךָ לְ֝מַ֗עַן לֹ֣א אֵבֽוֹשׁ׃	Let my heart be sound in thy statutes; that I be not ashamed.	γενηθήτω ἡ καρδία μου ἄμωμος ἐν τοῖς δικαιώμασί σου, ὅπως ἂν μὴ αἰσχυνθῶ.	Fiat cor meum immaculatum in iustificationibus tuis, ut non confundar.
Caph (כ)
81	כָּלְתָ֣ה לִתְשׁוּעָתְךָ֣ נַפְשִׁ֑י לִדְבָרְךָ֥ יִחָֽלְתִּי׃	My soul fainteth for thy salvation: but I hope in thy word.	᾿Εκλείπει εἰς τὸ σωτήριόν σου ἡ ψυχή μου, εἰς τοὺς λόγους σου ἐπήλπισα.	Defecit in salutare tuum anima mea, et in verbum tuum supersperavi.
82	כָּל֣וּ עֵ֭ינַי לְאִמְרָתֶ֑ךָ לֵ֝אמֹ֗ר מָתַ֥י תְּֽנַחֲמֵֽנִי׃	Mine eyes fail for thy word, saying, When wilt thou comfort me?	ἐξέλιπον οἱ ὀφθαλμοί μου εἰς τὸ λόγιόν σου λέγοντες· πότε παρακαλέσεις με;	Defecerunt oculi mei in eloquium tuum, dicentes: “Quando consolaberis me?”.
83	כִּֽי־הָ֭יִיתִי כְּנֹ֣אד בְּקִיט֑וֹר חֻ֝קֶּ֗יךָ לֹ֣א שָׁכָֽחְתִּי׃	For I am become like a bottle in the smoke; yet do I not forget thy statutes.	ὅτι ἐγενήθην ὡς ἀσκὸς ἐν πάχνῃ· τὰ δικαιώματά σου οὐκ ἐπελαθόμην.	Quia factus sum sicut uter in fumo; iustificationes tuas non sum oblitus.
84	כַּמָּ֥ה יְמֵֽי־עַבְדֶּ֑ךָ מָתַ֬י תַּעֲשֶׂ֖ה בְרֹדְפַ֣י מִשְׁפָּֽט׃	How many are the days of thy servant? when wilt thou execute judgment on them that persecute me?	πόσαι εἰσὶν αἱ ἡμέραι τοῦ δούλου σου; πότε ποιήσεις μοι ἐκ τῶν καταδιωκόντων με κρίσιν;	Quot sunt dies servi tui? Quando facies de persequentibus me iudicium?
85	כָּרוּ־לִ֣י זֵדִ֣ים שִׁיח֑וֹת אֲ֝שֶׁ֗ר לֹ֣א כְתוֹרָתֶֽךָ׃	The proud have digged pits for me, which are not after thy law.	διηγήσαντό μοι παράνομοι ἀδολεσχίας, ἀλλ᾿ οὐχ ὡς ὁ νόμος σου, Κύριε.	Foderunt mihi foveas superbi, qui non sunt secundum legem tuam.
86	כׇּל־מִצְוֺתֶ֥יךָ אֱמוּנָ֑ה שֶׁ֖קֶר רְדָפ֣וּנִי עׇזְרֵֽנִי׃	All thy commandments are faithful: they persecute me wrongfully; help thou me.	πᾶσαι αἱ ἐντολαί σου ἀλήθεια· ἀδίκως κατεδίωξάν με, βοήθησόν μοι.	Omnia praecepta tua veritas; dolose persecuti sunt me; adiuva me.
87	כִּ֭מְעַט כִּלּ֣וּנִי בָאָ֑רֶץ וַ֝אֲנִ֗י לֹא־עָזַ֥בְתִּי פִקֻּדֶֽיךָ׃	They had almost consumed me upon earth; but I forsook not thy precepts.	παρὰ βραχὺ συνετέλεσάν με ἐν τῇ γῇ, ἐγὼ δὲ οὐκ ἐγκατέλιπον τὰς ἐντολάς σου.	Paulo minus consummaverunt me in terra, ego autem non dereliqui mandata tua.
88	כְּחַסְדְּךָ֥ חַיֵּ֑נִי וְ֝אֶשְׁמְרָ֗ה עֵד֥וּת פִּֽיךָ׃	Quicken me after thy lovingkindness; so shall I keep the testimony of thy mouth.	κατὰ τὸ ἔλεός σου ζῆσόν με, καὶ φυλάξω τὰ μαρτύρια τοῦ στόματός σου.	Secundum misericordiam tuam vivifica me, et custodiam testimonia oris tui. -
Lamed (ל)
89	לְעוֹלָ֥ם יְהֹוָ֑ה דְּ֝בָרְךָ֗ נִצָּ֥ב בַּשָּׁמָֽיִם׃	For ever, O Lord, thy word is settled in heaven.	Εἰς τὸν αἰῶνα, Κύριε, ὁ λόγος σου διαμένει ἐν τῷ οὐρανῷ.	In aeternum, Domine, verbum tuum constitutum est in caelo.
90	לְדֹ֣ר וָ֭דֹר אֱמוּנָתֶ֑ךָ כּוֹנַ֥נְתָּֽ אֶ֝֗רֶץ וַֽתַּעֲמֹֽד׃	Thy faithfulness is unto all generations: thou hast established the earth, and it abideth.	εἰς γενεὰν καὶ γενεὰν ἡ ἀλήθειά σου· ἐθεμελίωσας τὴν γῆν καὶ διαμένει.	In generationem et generationem veritas tua; firmasti terram, et permanet.
91	לְֽ֭מִשְׁפָּטֶיךָ עָמְד֣וּ הַיּ֑וֹם כִּ֖י הַכֹּ֣ל עֲבָדֶֽיךָ׃	They continue this day according to thine ordinances: for all are thy servants.	τῇ διατάξει σου διαμένει ἡμέρα, ὅτι τὰ σύμπαντα δοῦλα σά.	Secundum iudicia tua permanent hodie, quoniam omnia serviunt tibi.
92	לוּלֵ֣י ת֭וֹרָתְךָ שַׁעֲשֻׁעָ֑י אָ֝֗ז אָבַ֥דְתִּי בְעׇנְיִֽי׃	Unless thy law had been my delights, I should then have perished in mine affliction.	εἰ μὴ ὅτι ὁ νόμος σου μελέτη μού ἐστι, τότε ἂν ἀπωλόμην ἐν τῇ ταπεινώσει μου.	Nisi quod lex tua delectatio mea est, tunc forte periissem in humilia tione mea.
93	לְ֭עוֹלָם לֹא־אֶשְׁכַּ֣ח פִּקּוּדֶ֑יךָ כִּ֥י בָ֝֗ם חִיִּיתָֽנִי׃	I will never forget thy precepts: for with them thou hast quickened me.	εἰς τὸν αἰῶνα οὐ μὴ ἐπιλάθωμαι τῶν δικαιωμάτων σου, ὅτι ἐν αὐτοῖς ἔζησάς με.	In aeternum non obliviscar man data tua, quia in ipsis vivificasti me.
94	לְֽךָ־אֲ֭נִי הוֹשִׁיעֵ֑נִי כִּ֖י פִקּוּדֶ֣יךָ דָרָֽשְׁתִּי׃	I am thine, save me: for I have sought thy precepts.	σός εἰμι ἐγώ, σῶσόν με, ὅτι τὰ δικαιώματά σου ἐξεζήτησα.	Tuus sum ego: salvum me fac, quoniam mandata tua exqui sivi.
95	לִ֤י קִוּ֣וּ רְשָׁעִ֣ים לְאַבְּדֵ֑נִי עֵ֝דֹתֶ֗יךָ אֶתְבּוֹנָֽן׃	The wicked have waited for me to destroy me: but I will consider thy testimonies.	ἐμὲ ὑπέμειναν ἁμαρτωλοὶ τοῦ ἀπολέσαι με· τὰ μαρτύριά σου συνῆκα.	Me exspectaverunt peccatores, ut perderent me; testimonia tua intellexi.
96	לְֽכׇל־תִּ֭כְלָה רָאִ֣יתִי קֵ֑ץ רְחָבָ֖ה מִצְוָתְךָ֣ מְאֹֽד׃	I have seen an end of all perfection: but thy commandment is exceeding broad.	πάσης συντελείας εἶδον πέρας· πλατεῖα ἡ ἐντολή σου σφόδρα.	Omni consummationi vidi finem, latum praeceptum tuum nimis.
Mem (מ)
97	מָה־אָהַ֥בְתִּי תוֹרָתֶ֑ךָ כׇּל־הַ֝יּ֗וֹם הִ֣יא שִׂיחָתִֽי׃	O how love I thy law! it is my meditation all the day.	῾Ως ἠγάπησα τὸν νόμον σου, Κύριε· ὅλην τὴν ἡμέραν μελέτη μού ἐστιν.	Quomodo dilexi legem tuam, Domine; tota die meditatio mea est.
98	מֵֽ֭אֹיְבַי תְּחַכְּמֵ֣נִי מִצְוֺתֶ֑ךָ כִּ֖י לְעוֹלָ֣ם הִיא־לִֽי׃	Thou through thy commandments hast made me wiser than mine enemies: for they are ever with me.	ὑπὲρ τοὺς ἐχθρούς μου ἐσόφισάς με τὴν ἐντολήν σου, ὅτι εἰς τὸν αἰῶνα ἐμή ἐστιν.	Super inimicos meos sapientem me fecit praeceptum tuum, quia in aeternum mihi est.
99	מִכׇּל־מְלַמְּדַ֥י הִשְׂכַּ֑לְתִּי כִּ֥י עֵ֝דְוֺתֶ֗יךָ שִׂ֣יחָה לִֽי׃	I have more understanding than all my teachers: for thy testimonies are my meditation.	ὑπὲρ πάντας τοὺς διδάσκοντάς με συνῆκα, ὅτι τὰ μαρτύριά σου μελέτη μού ἐστιν.	Super omnes docentes me prudens factus sum, quia testimonia tua meditatio mea est.
100	מִזְּקֵנִ֥ים אֶתְבּוֹנָ֑ן כִּ֖י פִקּוּדֶ֣יךָ נָצָֽרְתִּי׃	I understand more than the ancients, because I keep thy precepts. (Note: Other translations refer to "the aged" or "the elders". Albert Barnes recognises that the word "does not refer, as the word 'ancients' does with us, to the people of former times, but to aged men".)	ὑπὲρ πρεσβυτέρους συνῆκα, ὅτι τὰς ἐντολάς σου ἐξεζήτησα.	Super senes intellexi, quia mandata tua servavi.
101	מִכׇּל־אֹ֣רַח רָ֭ע כָּלִ֣אתִי רַגְלָ֑י לְ֝מַ֗עַן אֶשְׁמֹ֥ר דְּבָרֶֽךָ׃	I have refrained my feet from every evil way, that I might keep thy word.	ἐκ πάσης ὁδοῦ πονηρᾶς ἐκώλυσα τοὺς πόδας μου, ὅπως ἂν φυλάξω τοὺς λόγους σου.	Ab omni via mala prohibui pedes meos, ut custodiam verba tua.
102	מִמִּשְׁפָּטֶ֥יךָ לֹא־סָ֑רְתִּי כִּי־אַ֝תָּ֗ה הוֹרֵתָֽנִי׃	I have not departed from thy judgments: for thou hast taught me.	ἀπὸ τῶν κριμάτων σου οὐκ ἐξέκλινα, ὅτι σὺ ἐνομοθέτησάς με.	A iudiciis tuis non declinavi, quia tu legem posuisti mihi.
103	מַה־נִּמְלְצ֣וּ לְ֭חִכִּי אִמְרָתֶ֗ךָ מִדְּבַ֥שׁ לְפִֽי׃	How sweet are thy words unto my taste! yea, sweeter than honey to my mouth!	ὡς γλυκέα τῷ λάρυγγί μου τὰ λόγιά σου, ὑπὲρ μέλι τῷ στόματί μου.	Quam dulcia faucibus meis eloquia tua, super mel ori meo.
104	מִפִּקּוּדֶ֥יךָ אֶתְבּוֹנָ֑ן עַל־כֵּ֝֗ן שָׂנֵ֤אתִי ׀ כׇּל־אֹ֬רַח שָֽׁקֶר׃	Through thy precepts I get understanding: therefore I hate every false way.	ἀπὸ τῶν ἐντολῶν σου συνῆκα· διὰ τοῦτο ἐμίσησα πᾶσαν ὁδὸν ἀδικίας.	A mandatis tuis intellexi; propterea odivi omnem viam mendacii.
Nun (נ)
105	נֵר־לְרַגְלִ֥י דְבָרֶ֑ךָ וְ֝א֗וֹר לִנְתִיבָתִֽי׃	Thy word is a lamp unto my feet, and a light unto my path.	Λύχνος τοῖς ποσί μου ὁ νόμος σου καὶ φῶς ταῖς τρίβοις μου.	Lucerna pedibus meis verbum tuum et lumen semitis meis.
106	נִשְׁבַּ֥עְתִּי וָאֲקַיֵּ֑מָה לִ֝שְׁמֹ֗ר מִשְׁפְּטֵ֥י צִדְקֶֽךָ׃	I have sworn, and I will perform it, that I will keep thy righteous judgments.	ὤμοσα καὶ ἔστησα τοῦ φυλάξασθαι τὰ κρίματα τῆς δικαιοσύνης σου.	Iuravi et statui custodire iudicia iustitiae tuae.
107	נַעֲנֵ֥יתִי עַד־מְאֹ֑ד יְ֝הֹוָ֗ה חַיֵּ֥נִי כִדְבָרֶֽךָ׃	I am afflicted very much: quicken me, O Lord, according unto thy word.	ἐταπεινώθην ἕως σφόδρα· Κύριε, ζῆσόν με κατὰ τὸν λόγον σου.	Humiliatus sum usquequaque, Domine; vivifica me secundum verbum tuum.
108	נִדְב֣וֹת פִּ֭י רְצֵה־נָ֣א יְהֹוָ֑ה וּֽמִשְׁפָּטֶ֥יךָ לַמְּדֵֽנִי׃	Accept, I beseech thee, the freewill offerings of my mouth, O Lord, and teach me thy judgments.	τὰ ἑκούσια τοῦ στόματός μου εὐδόκησον δή, Κύριε, καὶ τὰ κρίματά σου δίδαξόν με.	Voluntaria oris mei beneplacita sint, Domine, et iudicia tua doce me.
109	נַפְשִׁ֣י בְכַפִּ֣י תָמִ֑יד וְ֝ת֥וֹרָתְךָ֗ לֹ֣א שָׁכָֽחְתִּי׃	My soul is continually in my hand: yet do I not forget thy law.	ἡ ψυχή μου ἐν ταῖς χερσί σου διαπαντός, καὶ τοῦ νόμου σου οὐκ ἐπελαθόμην.	Anima mea in manibus meis semper, et legem tuam non sum oblitus.
110	נָתְנ֬וּ רְשָׁעִ֣ים פַּ֣ח לִ֑י וּ֝מִפִּקּוּדֶ֗יךָ לֹ֣א תָעִֽיתִי׃	The wicked have laid a snare for me: yet I erred not from thy precepts.	ἔθεντο ἁμαρτωλοὶ παγίδα μοι, καὶ ἐκ τῶν ἐντολῶν σου οὐκ ἐπλανήθην.	Posuerunt peccatores laqueum mihi, et de mandatis tuis non erravi.
111	נָחַ֣לְתִּי עֵדְוֺתֶ֣יךָ לְעוֹלָ֑ם כִּֽי־שְׂשׂ֖וֹן לִבִּ֣י הֵֽמָּה׃	Thy testimonies have I taken as an heritage for ever: for they are the rejoicing of my heart.	ἐκληρονόμησα τὰ μαρτύριά σου εἰς τὸν αἰῶνα, ὅτι ἀγαλλίαμα τῆς καρδίας μού εἰσιν.	Hereditas mea testimonia tua in aeternum, quia exsultatio cordis mei sunt.
112	נָטִ֣יתִי לִ֭בִּי לַעֲשׂ֥וֹת חֻקֶּ֗יךָ לְעוֹלָ֥ם עֵֽקֶב׃	I have inclined mine heart to perform thy statutes alway, even unto the end.	ἔκλινα τὴν καρδίαν μου τοῦ ποιῆσαι τὰ δικαιώματά σου εἰς τὸν αἰῶνα δι᾿ ἀντάμειψιν.	Inclinavi cor meum ad faciendas iustificationes tuas in aeternum, in finem.
Samech (ס)
113	סֵעֲפִ֥ים שָׂנֵ֑אתִי וְֽתוֹרָתְךָ֥ אָהָֽבְתִּי׃	I hate vain thoughts: but thy law do I love.	Παρανόμους ἐμίσησα, τὸν δὲ νόμον σου ἠγάπησα.	Duplices corde odio habui et legem tuam dilexi.
114	סִתְרִ֣י וּמָגִנִּ֣י אָ֑תָּה לִדְבָרְךָ֥ יִחָֽלְתִּי׃	Thou art my hiding place and my shield: I hope in thy word.	βοηθός μου, καὶ ἀντιλήπτωρ μου εἶ σύ· εἰς τοὺς λόγους σου ἐπήλπισα.	Tegmen et scutum meum es tu, et in verbum tuum supersperavi.
115	סוּרוּ־מִמֶּ֥נִּי מְרֵעִ֑ים וְ֝אֶצְּרָ֗ה מִצְוֺ֥ת אֱלֹהָֽי׃	Depart from me, ye evildoers: for I will keep the commandments of my God.	ἐκκλίνατε ἀπ᾿ ἐμοῦ, πονηρευόμενοι, καὶ ἐξερευνήσω τὰς ἐντολὰς τοῦ Θεοῦ μου.	Declinate a me, maligni, et servabo praecepta Dei mei.
116	סׇמְכֵ֣נִי כְאִמְרָתְךָ֣ וְאֶחְיֶ֑ה וְאַל־תְּ֝בִישֵׁ֗נִי מִשִּׂבְרִֽי׃	Uphold me according unto thy word, that I may live: and let me not be ashamed of my hope.	ἀντιλαβοῦ μου κατὰ τὸ λόγιόν σου, καὶ ζῆσόν με, καὶ μὴ καταισχύνῃς με ἀπὸ τῆς προσδοκίας μου.	Suscipe me secundum eloquium tuum, et vivam; et non confundas me ab exspectatione mea.
117	סְעָדֵ֥נִי וְאִוָּשֵׁ֑עָה וְאֶשְׁעָ֖ה בְחֻקֶּ֣יךָ תָמִֽיד׃	Hold thou me up, and I shall be safe: and I will have respect unto thy statutes continually.	βοήθησόν μοι, καὶ σωθήσομαι καὶ μελετήσω ἐν τοῖς δικαιώμασί σου διαπαντός.	Sustenta me, et salvus ero et delectabor in iustificationibus tuis semper.
118	סָ֭לִיתָ כׇּל־שׁוֹגִ֣ים מֵחֻקֶּ֑יךָ כִּי־שֶׁ֝֗קֶר תַּרְמִיתָֽם׃	Thou hast trodden down all them that err from thy statutes: for their deceit is falsehood.	ἐξουδένωσας πάντας τοὺς ἀποστατοῦντας ἀπὸ τῶν δικαιωμάτων σου, ὅτι ἄδικον τὸ ἐνθύμημα αὐτῶν.	Sprevisti omnes discedentes a iustificationibus tuis, quia mendacium cogitatio eorum.
119	סִגִ֗ים הִשְׁבַּ֥תָּ כׇל־רִשְׁעֵי־אָ֑רֶץ לָ֝כֵ֗ן אָהַ֥בְתִּי עֵדֹתֶֽיךָ׃	Thou puttest away all the wicked of the earth like dross: therefore I love thy testimonies.	παραβαίνοντας ἐλογισάμην πάντας τοὺς ἁμαρτωλοὺς τῆς γῆς· διὰ τοῦτο ἠγάπησα τὰ μαρτύριά σου.	Quasi scoriam delesti omnes peccatores terrae; ideo dilexi testimonia tua.
120	סָמַ֣ר מִפַּחְדְּךָ֣ בְשָׂרִ֑י וּֽמִמִּשְׁפָּטֶ֥יךָ יָרֵֽאתִי׃	My flesh trembleth for fear of thee; and I am afraid of thy judgments.	καθήλωσον ἐκ τοῦ φόβου σου τὰς σάρκας μου· ἀπὸ γὰρ τῶν κριμάτων σου ἐφοβήθην.	Horruit a timore tuo caro mea; a iudiciis enim tuis timui.
Ain (ע)
121	עָ֭שִׂיתִי מִשְׁפָּ֣ט וָצֶ֑דֶק בַּל־תַּ֝נִּיחֵ֗נִי לְעֹשְׁקָֽי׃	I have done judgment and justice: leave me not to mine oppressors.	᾿Εποίησα κρῖμα καὶ δικαιοσύνην· μὴ παραδῷς με τοῖς ἀδικοῦσί με.	Feci iudicium et iustitiam; non tradas me calumniantibus me.
122	עֲרֹ֣ב עַבְדְּךָ֣ לְט֑וֹב אַֽל־יַעַשְׁקֻ֥נִי זֵדִֽים׃	Be surety for thy servant for good: let not the proud oppress me.	ἔκδεξαι τὸν δοῦλόν σου εἰς ἀγαθόν· μὴ συκοφαντησάτωσάν με ὑπερήφανοι.	Sponde pro servo tuo in bonum; non calumnientur me superbi.
123	עֵ֭ינַי כָּל֣וּ לִישׁוּעָתֶ֑ךָ וּלְאִמְרַ֥ת צִדְקֶֽךָ׃	Mine eyes fail for thy salvation, and for the word of thy righteousness.	οἱ ὀφθαλμοί μου ἐξέλιπον εἰς τὸ σωτήριόν σου καὶ εἰς τὸ λόγιον τῆς δικαιοσύνης σου.	Oculi mei defecerunt in desiderio salutaris tui et eloquii iustitiae tuae.
124	עֲשֵׂ֖ה עִם־עַבְדְּךָ֥ כְחַסְדֶּ֗ךָ וְחֻקֶּ֥יךָ לַמְּדֵֽנִי׃	Deal with thy servant according unto thy mercy, and teach me thy statutes.	ποίησον μετὰ τοῦ δούλου σου κατὰ τὸ ἔλεός σου καὶ τὰ δικαιώματά σου δίδαξόν με.	Fac cum servo tuo secundum misericordiam tuam et iustificationes tuas doce me.
125	עַבְדְּךָ־אָ֥נִי הֲבִינֵ֑נִי וְ֝אֵדְעָ֗ה עֵֽדֹתֶֽיךָ׃	I am thy servant; give me understanding, that I may know thy testimonies.	δοῦλός σού εἰμι ἐγώ· συνέτισόν με, καὶ γνώσομαι τὰ μαρτύριά σου.	Servus tuus sum ego; da mihi intellectum, ut sciam testimonia tua.
126	עֵ֭ת לַעֲשׂ֣וֹת לַיהֹוָ֑ה הֵ֝פֵ֗רוּ תּוֹרָתֶֽךָ׃	It is time for thee, Lord, to work: for they have made void thy law.	καιρὸς τοῦ ποιῆσαι τῷ Κυρίῳ· διεσκέδασαν τὸν νόμον σου.	Tempus faciendi Domino; dissipaverunt legem tuam.
127	עַל־כֵּ֭ן אָהַ֣בְתִּי מִצְוֺתֶ֑יךָ מִזָּהָ֥ב וּמִפָּֽז׃	Therefore I love thy commandments above gold; yea, above fine gold.	διὰ τοῦτο ἠγάπησα τὰς ἐντολάς σου ὑπὲρ χρυσίον καὶ τοπάζιον.	Ideo dilexi praecepta tua super aurum et obryzum.
128	עַל־כֵּ֤ן ׀ כׇּל־פִּקּ֣וּדֵי כֹ֣ל יִשָּׁ֑רְתִּי כׇּל־אֹ֖רַח שֶׁ֣קֶר שָׂנֵֽאתִי׃	Therefore I esteem all thy precepts concerning all things to be right; and I hate every false way.	διὰ τοῦτο πρὸς πάσας τὰς ἐντολάς σου κατωρθούμην, πᾶσαν ὁδὸν ἄδικον ἐμίσησα.	Propterea ad omnia mandata tua dirigebar, omnem viam mendacii odio habui. -
Pe (פ)
129	פְּלָא֥וֹת עֵדְוֺתֶ֑יךָ עַל־כֵּ֝֗ן נְצָרָ֥תַם נַפְשִֽׁי׃	Thy testimonies are wonderful: therefore doth my soul keep them.	Θαυμαστὰ τὰ μαρτύριά σου· διὰ τοῦτο ἐξηρεύνησεν αὐτὰ ἡ ψυχή μου.	Mirabilia testimonia tua, ideo servavit ea anima mea.
130	פֵּ֖תַח דְּבָרֶ֥יךָ יָאִ֗יר מֵבִ֥ין פְּתָיִֽים׃	The entrance of thy words giveth light; it giveth understanding unto the simple.	ἡ δήλωσις τῶν λόγων σου φωτιεῖ καὶ συνετιεῖ νηπίους.	Declaratio sermonum tuorum illuminat et intellectum dat parvulis.
131	פִּֽי־פָ֭עַרְתִּי וָאֶשְׁאָ֑פָה כִּ֖י לְמִצְוֺתֶ֣יךָ יָאָֽבְתִּי׃	I opened my mouth, and panted: for I longed for thy commandments.	τὸ στόμα μου ἤνοιξα καὶ εἵλκυσα πνεῦμα, ὅτι τὰς ἐντολάς σου ἐπεπόθουν.	Os meum aperui et attraxi spiritum, quia praecepta tua desiderabam.
132	פְּנֵה־אֵלַ֥י וְחׇנֵּ֑נִי כְּ֝מִשְׁפָּ֗ט לְאֹהֲבֵ֥י שְׁמֶֽךָ׃	Look thou upon me, and be merciful unto me, as thou usest to do unto those that love thy name.	᾿Επίβλεψον ἐπ᾿ ἐμὲ καὶ ἐλέησόν με κατὰ τὸ κρίμα τῶν ἀγαπώντων τὸ ὄνομά σου.	Convertere in me et miserere mei secundum iudicium tuum cum diligentibus nomen tuum.
133	פְּ֭עָמַי הָכֵ֣ן בְּאִמְרָתֶ֑ךָ וְֽאַל־תַּשְׁלֶט־בִּ֥י כׇל־אָֽוֶן׃	Order my steps in thy word: and let not any iniquity have dominion over me.	τὰ διαβήματά μου κατεύθυνον κατὰ τὸ λόγιόν σου, καὶ μὴ κατακυριευσάτω μου πᾶσα ἀνομία.	Gressus meos dirige secundum eloquium tuum, et non dominetur mei omnis iniquitas.
134	פְּ֭דֵנִי מֵעֹ֣שֶׁק אָדָ֑ם וְ֝אֶשְׁמְרָ֗ה פִּקּוּדֶֽיךָ׃	Deliver me from the oppression of man: so will I keep thy precepts.	λύτρωσαί με ἀπὸ συκοφαντίας ἀνθρώπων, καὶ φυλάξω τὰς ἐντολάς σου.	Redime me a calumniis hominum, ut custodiam mandata tua.
135	פָּ֭נֶיךָ הָאֵ֣ר בְּעַבְדֶּ֑ךָ וְ֝לַמְּדֵ֗נִי אֶת־חֻקֶּֽיךָ׃	Make thy face to shine upon thy servant; and teach me thy statutes.	τὸ πρόσωπόν σου ἐπίφανον ἐπὶ τὸν δοῦλόν σου καὶ δίδαξόν με τὰ δικαιώματά σου.	Faciem tuam illumina super servum tuum et doce me iustificationes tuas.
136	פַּלְגֵי־מַ֭יִם יָרְד֣וּ עֵינָ֑י עַ֝֗ל לֹא־שָׁמְר֥וּ תֽוֹרָתֶֽךָ׃	Rivers of waters run down mine eyes, because they keep not thy law.	διεξόδους ὑδάτων κατέδυσαν οἱ ὀφθαλμοί μου, ἐπεὶ οὐκ ἐφύλαξα τὸν νόμον σου.	Rivulos aquarum deduxerunt oculi mei, quia non custodierunt legem tuam.
Tzaddi (צ)
137	צַדִּ֣יק אַתָּ֣ה יְהֹוָ֑ה וְ֝יָשָׁ֗ר מִשְׁפָּטֶֽיךָ׃	Righteous art thou, O Lord, and upright are thy judgments.	Δίκαιος εἶ, Κύριε, καὶ εὐθεῖαι αἱ κρίσεις σου.	Iustus es, Domine, et rectum iudicium tuum.
138	צִ֭וִּיתָ צֶ֣דֶק עֵדֹתֶ֑יךָ וֶאֱמוּנָ֥ה מְאֹֽד׃	Thy testimonies that thou hast commanded are righteous and very faithful.	ἐνετείλω δικαιοσύνην τὰ μαρτύριά σου καὶ ἀλήθειαν σφόδρα.	Mandasti in iustitia testimonia tua et in veritate nimis.
139	צִמְּתַ֥תְנִי קִנְאָתִ֑י כִּֽי־שָׁכְח֖וּ דְבָרֶ֣יךָ צָרָֽי׃	My zeal hath consumed me, because mine enemies have forgotten thy words.	ἐξέτηξέ με ὁ ζῆλός σου, ὅτι ἐπελάθοντο τῶν λόγων σου οἱ ἐχθροί μου.	Consumpsit me zelus meus, quia obliti sunt verba tua inimici mei.
140	צְרוּפָ֖ה אִמְרָתְךָ֥ מְאֹ֗ד וְֽעַבְדְּךָ֥ אֲהֵבָֽהּ׃	Thy word is very pure: therefore thy servant loveth it.	πεπυρωμένον τὸ λόγιόν σου σφόδρα, καὶ ὁ δοῦλός σου ἠγάπησεν αὐτό.	Ignitum eloquium tuum vehementer, et servus tuus dilexit illud.
141	צָעִ֣יר אָנֹכִ֣י וְנִבְזֶ֑ה פִּ֝קֻּדֶ֗יךָ לֹ֣א שָׁכָֽחְתִּי׃	I am small and despised: yet do not I forget thy precepts.	νεώτερος ἐγώ εἰμι καὶ ἐξουδενωμένος· τὰ δικαιώματά σου οὐκ ἐπελαθόμην.	Adulescentulus sum ego et contemptus; mandata tua non sum oblitus.
142	צִדְקָתְךָ֣ צֶ֣דֶק לְעוֹלָ֑ם וְֽתוֹרָתְךָ֥ אֱמֶֽת׃	Thy righteousness is an everlasting righteousness, and thy law is the truth.	ἡ δικαιοσύνη σου δικαιοσύνη εἰς τὸν αἰῶνα, καὶ ὁ νόμος σου ἀλήθεια.	Iustitia tua iustitia in aeternum, et lex tua veritas.
143	צַר־וּמָצ֥וֹק מְצָא֑וּנִי מִ֝צְוֺתֶ֗יךָ שַׁעֲשֻׁעָֽי׃	Trouble and anguish have taken hold on me: yet thy commandments are my delights.	θλίψεις καὶ ἀνάγκαι εὕροσάν με· αἱ ἐντολαί σου μελέτη μου.	Tribulatio et angustia invenerunt me; praecepta tua delectatio mea est.
144	צֶ֖דֶק עֵדְוֺתֶ֥יךָ לְעוֹלָ֗ם הֲבִינֵ֥נִי וְאֶחְיֶֽה׃	The righteousness of thy testimonies is everlasting: give me understanding, and I shall live.	δικαιοσύνη τὰ μαρτύριά σου εἰς τὸν αἰῶνα· συνέτισόν με, καὶ ζήσομαι	Iustitia testimonia tua in aeternum; intellectum da mihi, et vivam.
Koph (ק)
145	קָרָ֣אתִי בְכׇל־לֵ֭ב עֲנֵ֥נִי יְהֹוָ֗ה חֻקֶּ֥יךָ אֶצֹּֽרָה׃	I cried with my whole heart; hear me, O Lord: I will keep thy statutes.	᾿Εκέκραξα ἐν ὅλῃ καρδίᾳ μου· ἐπάκουσόν μου, Κύριε, τὰ δικαιώματά σου ἐκζητήσω.	Clamavi in toto corde, exaudi me, Domine; iustificationes tuas servabo.
146	קְרָאתִ֥יךָ הוֹשִׁיעֵ֑נִי וְ֝אֶשְׁמְרָ֗ה עֵדֹתֶֽיךָ׃	I cried unto thee; save me, and I shall keep thy testimonies.	ἐκέκραξά σοι· σῶσόν με, καὶ φυλάξω τὰ μαρτύριά σου.	Clamavi ad te, salvum me fac, ut custodiam testimonia tua.
147	קִדַּ֣מְתִּי בַ֭נֶּשֶׁף וָאֲשַׁוֵּ֑עָה (לדבריך) [לִדְבָרְךָ֥] יִחָֽלְתִּי׃	I prevented the dawning of the morning, and cried: I hoped in thy word.	προέφθασα ἐν ἀωρίᾳ καὶ ἐκέκραξα, εἰς τοὺς λόγους σου ἐπήλπισα.	Praeveni diluculo et clamavi, in verba tua supersperavi.
148	קִדְּמ֣וּ עֵ֭ינַי אַשְׁמֻר֑וֹת לָ֝שִׂ֗יחַ בְּאִמְרָתֶֽךָ׃	Mine eyes prevent the night watches, that I might meditate in thy word.	προέφθασαν οἱ ὀφθαλμοί μου πρὸς ὄρθρον τοῦ μελετᾶν τὰ λόγιά σου.	Praevenerunt oculi mei vigilias, ut meditarer eloquia tua.
149	ק֭וֹלִי שִׁמְעָ֣ה כְחַסְדֶּ֑ךָ יְ֝הֹוָ֗ה כְּֽמִשְׁפָּטֶ֥ךָ חַיֵּֽנִי׃	Hear my voice according unto thy lovingkindness: O Lord, quicken me according to thy judgment.	τῆς φωνῆς μου ἄκουσον, Κύριε, κατὰ τὸ ἔλεός σου, κατὰ τὸ κρῖμά σου ζῆσόν με.	Vocem meam audi secundum misericordiam tuam, Domine, secundum iudicium tuum vivifica me.
150	קָ֭רְבוּ רֹדְפֵ֣י זִמָּ֑ה מִתּוֹרָתְךָ֥ רָחָֽקוּ׃	They draw nigh that follow after mischief: they are far from thy law.	προσήγγισαν οἱ καταδιώκοντές με ἀνομίᾳ, ἀπὸ δὲ τοῦ νόμου σου ἐμακρύνθησαν.	Appropinquaverunt persequentes me in malitia, a lege autem tua longe facti sunt.
151	קָר֣וֹב אַתָּ֣ה יְהֹוָ֑ה וְֽכׇל־מִצְוֺתֶ֥יךָ אֱמֶֽת׃	Thou art near, O Lord; and all thy commandments are truth.	ἐγγὺς εἶ, Κύριε, καὶ πᾶσαι αἱ ὁδοί σου ἀλήθεια.	Prope es tu, Domine, et omnia praecepta tua veritas.
152	קֶ֣דֶם יָ֭דַעְתִּי מֵעֵדֹתֶ֑יךָ כִּ֖י לְעוֹלָ֣ם יְסַדְתָּֽם׃	Concerning thy testimonies, I have known of old that thou hast founded them for ever.	κατ᾿ ἀρχὰς ἔγνων ἐκ τῶν μαρτυρίων σου, ὅτι εἰς τὸν αἰῶνα ἐθεμελίωσας αὐτά.	Ab initio cognovi de testimoniis tuis, quia in aeternum fundasti ea.
Resh (ר)
153	רְאֵה־עׇנְיִ֥י וְחַלְּצֵ֑נִי כִּי־ת֥֝וֹרָתְךָ֗ לֹ֣א שָׁכָֽחְתִּי׃	Consider mine affliction, and deliver me: for I do not forget thy law.	Ἴδε τὴν ταπείνωσίν μου καὶ ἐξελοῦ με, ὅτι τοῦ νόμου σου οὐκ ἐπελαθόμην.	Vide humiliationem meam et eripe me, quia legem tuam non sum oblitus.
154	רִיבָ֣ה רִ֭יבִי וּגְאָלֵ֑נִי לְאִמְרָתְךָ֥ חַיֵּֽנִי׃	Plead my cause, and deliver me: quicken me according to thy word.	κρῖνον τὴν κρίσιν μου καὶ λύτρωσαί με· διὰ τὸν λόγον σου ζῆσόν με.	Iudica causam meam et redime me; propter eloquium tuum vivifica me.
155	רָח֣וֹק מֵרְשָׁעִ֣ים יְשׁוּעָ֑ה כִּי־חֻ֝קֶּ֗יךָ לֹ֣א דָרָֽשׁוּ׃	Salvation is far from the wicked: for they seek not thy statutes.	μακρὰν ἀπὸ ἁμαρτωλῶν σωτηρία, ὅτι τὰ δικαιώματά σου οὐκ ἐξεζήτησαν.	Longe a peccatoribus salus, quia iustificationes tuas non exquisierunt.
156	רַחֲמֶ֖יךָ רַבִּ֥ים ׀ יְהֹוָ֑ה כְּֽמִשְׁפָּטֶ֥יךָ חַיֵּֽנִי׃	Great are thy tender mercies, O Lord: quicken me according to thy judgments.	οἱ οἰκτιρμοί σου πολλοί, Κύριε· κατὰ τὸ κρῖμά σου ζῆσόν με.	Misericordiae tuae multae, Domine; secundum iudicia tua vivifica me.
157	רַ֭בִּים רֹדְפַ֣י וְצָרָ֑י מֵ֝עֵדְוֺתֶ֗יךָ לֹ֣א נָטִֽיתִי׃	Many are my persecutors and mine enemies; yet do I not decline from thy testimonies.	πολλοὶ οἱ ἐκδιώκοντές με καὶ θλίβοντές με· ἐκ τῶν μαρτυρίων σου οὐκ ἐξέκλινα.	Multi, qui persequuntur me et tribulant me; a testimoniis tuis non declinavi.
158	רָאִ֣יתִי בֹ֭גְדִים וָאֶתְקוֹטָ֑טָה אֲשֶׁ֥ר אִ֝מְרָתְךָ֗ לֹ֣א שָׁמָֽרוּ׃	I beheld the transgressors, and was grieved; because they kept not thy word.	εἶδον ἀσυνετοῦντας καὶ ἐξετηκόμην, ὅτι τὰ λόγιά σου οὐκ ἐφυλάξαντο.	Vidi praevaricantes, et taeduit me, quia eloquia tua non custodierunt.
159	רְ֭אֵה כִּי־פִקּוּדֶ֣יךָ אָהָ֑בְתִּי יְ֝הֹוָ֗ה כְּֽחַסְדְּךָ֥ חַיֵּֽנִי׃	Consider how I love thy precepts: quicken me, O Lord, according to thy lovingkindness.	ἴδε, ὅτι τὰς ἐντολάς σου ἠγάπησα· Κύριε, ἐν τῷ ἐλέει σου ζῆσόν με.	Vide quoniam mandata tua dilexi, Domine; secundum misericordiam tuam vivifica me.
160	רֹאשׁ־דְּבָרְךָ֥ אֱמֶ֑ת וּ֝לְעוֹלָ֗ם כׇּל־מִשְׁפַּ֥ט צִדְקֶֽךָ׃	Thy word is true from the beginning: and every one of thy righteous judgments endureth for ever.	ἀρχὴ τῶν λόγων σου ἀλήθεια, καὶ εἰς τὸν αἰῶνα πάντα τὰ κρίματα τῆς δικαιοσύνης σου.	Principium verborum tuorum veritas, in aeternum omnia iudicia iustitiae tuae.
Sin (ש)
161	שָׂ֭רִים רְדָפ֣וּנִי חִנָּ֑ם (ומדבריך) [וּ֝מִדְּבָרְךָ֗] פָּחַ֥ד לִבִּֽי׃	Princes have persecuted me without a cause: but my heart standeth in awe of thy word.	Ἄρχοντες κατεδίωξάν με δωρεάν, καὶ ἀπὸ τῶν λόγων σου ἐδειλίασεν ἡ καρδία μου.	Principes persecuti sunt me gratis, et a verbis tuis formidavit cor meum.
162	שָׂ֣שׂ אָ֭נֹכִי עַל־אִמְרָתֶ֑ךָ כְּ֝מוֹצֵ֗א שָׁלָ֥ל רָֽב׃	I rejoice at thy word, as one that findeth great spoil.	ἀγαλλιάσομαι ἐγὼ ἐπὶ τὰ λόγιά σου ὡς ὁ εὑρίσκων σκῦλα πολλά.	Laetabor ego super eloquia tua, sicut qui invenit spolia multa.
163	שֶׁ֣קֶר שָׂ֭נֵאתִי וַאֲתַעֵ֑בָה תּוֹרָתְךָ֥ אָהָֽבְתִּי׃	I hate and abhor lying: but thy law do I love.	ἀδικίαν ἐμίσησα καὶ ἐβδελυξάμην, τὸν δὲ νόμον σου ἠγάπησα.	Mendacium odio habui et abominatus sum; legem autem tuam dilexi.
164	שֶׁ֣בַע בַּ֭יּוֹם הִלַּלְתִּ֑יךָ עַ֝֗ל מִשְׁפְּטֵ֥י צִדְקֶֽךָ׃	Seven times a day do I praise thee because of thy righteous judgments.	ἑπτάκις τῆς ἡμέρας ᾔνεσά σε ἐπὶ τὰ κρίματα τῆς δικαιοσύνης σου.	Septies in die laudem dixi tibi super iudicia iustitiae tuae.
165	שָׁל֣וֹם רָ֭ב לְאֹהֲבֵ֣י תוֹרָתֶ֑ךָ וְאֵֽין־לָ֥מוֹ מִכְשֽׁוֹל׃	Great peace have they which love thy law: and nothing shall offend them.	εἰρήνη πολλὴ τοῖς ἀγαπῶσι τὸν νόμον σου, καὶ οὐκ ἔστιν αὐτοῖς σκάνδαλον.	Pax multa diligentibus legem tuam, et non est illis scandalum.
166	שִׂבַּ֣רְתִּי לִישׁוּעָתְךָ֣ יְהֹוָ֑ה וּֽמִצְוֺתֶ֥יךָ עָשִֽׂיתִי׃	Lord, I have hoped for thy salvation, and done thy commandments.	προσεδόκων τὸ σωτήριόν σου, Κύριε, καὶ τὰς ἐντολάς σου ἠγάπησα.	Exspectabam salutare tuum, Domine, et praecepta tua feci.
167	שָֽׁמְרָ֣ה נַ֭פְשִׁי עֵדֹתֶ֑יךָ וָאֹהֲבֵ֥ם מְאֹֽד׃	My soul hath kept thy testimonies; and I love them exceedingly.	ἐφύλαξεν ἡ ψυχή μου τὰ μαρτύριά σου καὶ ἠγάπησεν αὐτὰ σφόδρα.	Custodivit anima mea testimonia tua, et dilexi ea vehementer.
168	שָׁמַ֣רְתִּי פִ֭קּוּדֶיךָ וְעֵדֹתֶ֑יךָ כִּ֖י כׇל־דְּרָכַ֣י נֶגְדֶּֽךָ׃	I have kept thy precepts and thy testimonies: for all my ways are before thee.	ἐφύλαξα τὰς ἐντολάς σου καὶ τὰ μαρτύριά σου, ὅτι πᾶσαι αἱ ὁδοί μου ἐναντίον σου, Κύριε.	Servavi mandata tua et testimonia tua, quia omnes viae meae in conspectu tuo.
Tau (ת)
169	תִּקְרַ֤ב רִנָּתִ֣י לְפָנֶ֣יךָ יְהֹוָ֑ה כִּדְבָרְךָ֥ הֲבִינֵֽנִי׃	Let my cry come near before thee, O Lord: give me understanding according to thy word.	Ἐγγισάτω ἡ δέησίς μου ἐνώπιόν σου, Κύριε· κατὰ τὸ λόγιόν σου συνέτισόν με.	Appropinquet deprecatio mea in conspectu tuo, Domine; iuxta verbum tuum da mihi intellectum.
170	תָּב֣וֹא תְחִנָּתִ֣י לְפָנֶ֑יךָ כְּ֝אִמְרָתְךָ֗ הַצִּילֵֽנִי׃	Let my supplication come before thee: deliver me according to thy word.	εἰσέλθοι τὸ ἀξίωμά μου ἐνώπιόν σου, Κύριε· κατὰ τὸ λόγιόν σου ῥῦσαί με.	Intret postulatio mea in conspectu tuo; secundum eloquium tuum libera me.
171	תַּבַּ֣עְנָה שְׂפָתַ֣י תְּהִלָּ֑ה כִּ֖י תְלַמְּדֵ֣נִי חֻקֶּֽיךָ׃	My lips shall utter praise, when thou hast taught me thy statutes.	ἐξερεύξαιντο τὰ χείλη μου ὕμνον, ὅταν διδάξῃς με τὰ δικαιώματά σου.	Eructabunt labia mea hymnum, cum docueris me iustificationes tuas..
172	תַּ֣עַן לְ֭שׁוֹנִי אִמְרָתֶ֑ךָ כִּ֖י כׇל־מִצְוֺתֶ֣יךָ צֶּֽדֶק׃	My tongue shall speak of thy word: for all thy commandments are righteousness.	φθέγξαιτο ἡ γλῶσσά μου τὰ λόγιά σου, ὅτι πᾶσαι αἱ ἐντολαί σου δικαιοσύνη.	Cantet lingua mea eloquium tuum, quia omnia praecepta tua iustitia.
173	תְּהִי־יָדְךָ֥ לְעׇזְרֵ֑נִי כִּ֖י פִקּוּדֶ֣יךָ בָחָֽרְתִּי׃	Let thine hand help me; for I have chosen thy precepts.	γενέσθω ἡ χείρ σου τοῦ σῶσαί με, ὅτι τὰς ἐντολάς σου ᾑρετισάμην.	Fiat manus tua, ut adiuvet me, quoniam mandata tua elegi.
174	תָּאַ֣בְתִּי לִישׁוּעָתְךָ֣ יְהֹוָ֑ה וְ֝ת֥וֹרָתְךָ֗ שַׁעֲשֻׁעָֽי׃	I have longed for thy salvation, O Lord; and thy law is my delight.	ἐπεπόθησα τὸ σωτήριόν σου, Κύριε, καὶ ὁ νόμος σου μελέτη μού ἐστι.	Concupivi salutare tuum, Domine, et lex tua delectatio mea est.
175	תְּֽחִי־נַ֭פְשִׁי וּֽתְהַלְלֶ֑ךָּ וּֽמִשְׁפָּטֶ֥ךָ יַעְזְרֻֽנִי׃	Let my soul live, and it shall praise thee; and let thy judgments help me.	ζήσεται ἡ ψυχή μου καὶ αἰνέσει σε, καὶ τὰ κρίματά σου βοηθήσει μοι.	Vivet anima mea et laudabit te, et iudicia tua adiuvabunt me.
176	תָּעִ֗יתִי כְּשֶׂ֣ה אֹ֭בֵד בַּקֵּ֣שׁ עַבְדֶּ֑ךָ כִּ֥י מִ֝צְוֺתֶ֗יךָ לֹ֣א שָׁכָֽחְתִּי׃	I have gone astray like a lost sheep; seek thy servant; for I do not forget thy commandments.	ἐπλανήθην ὡς πρόβατον ἀπολωλός· ζήτησον τὸν δοῦλόν σου, ὅτι τὰς ἐντολάς σου οὐκ ἐπελαθόμην.	Erravi sicut ovis, quae periit; quaere servum tuum, quia praecepta tua non sum oblitus.

== See also ==
- Lamentations 3, also an acrostic, with three verses per stanza
- It is time to work for the Lord
