= Aus der Tiefe =

"Aus der Tiefen rufe ich, Herr, zu dir. Herr, höre meine Stimme ..." is a German translation of the opening words of Psalm 130 ("Out of the depths have I cried unto thee, O Lord. Lord, hear my voice, ..."). Aus der Tiefe(n) may also refer to:

== Music ==
- Aus der Tiefe, SWV 25, one of the Psalmen Davids by Heinrich Schütz, 1619
- "Aus der Tiefen rufe ich, Herr, zu dir, erhöre mich ...", German hymn by Georg Christoph Schwämmlein, 1676
- Aus der Tiefe, Geistliches Konzert by Johann Philipp Förtsch, c1700
- Aus der Tiefen rufe ich, Herr, zu dir, BWV 131, early cantata by Johann Sebastian Bach, c. 1707
- Aus der Tiefen rufen wir, GWV 1113/23a, cantata for the 2nd Sunday after Epiphany in 1723, Leipzig presentation piece by Christoph Graupner
- Aus der Tiefen rufe ich Herr höre meine Stimme, H. 419, cantata for Rogate by Gottfried Heinrich Stölzel, 1744
- Aus der Tiefe ruf' ich, Herr , cantata by Carl Friedrich Rungenhagen
- Aus der Tiefe rufe ich (Kiel), one of the Six Motets, Op. 82, by the 19th-century composer Friedrich Kiel
- Aus der Tiefe ruf' ich, Herr, zu dir, one of the Tübinger Psalmen by Max Drischner, 1948
- Aus der Tiefe rufe ich, Herr, zu dir by Volker Bräutigam, 1970
- Aus der Tiefe... for cello and organ by Zsigmond Szathmáry, 2019

== Literature ==
- Aus der Tiefe, poetry collection by Ada Christen, 1878
- Aus der Tiefe rufe ich, book by Cläre Jung, 1946
