= Psalm 129 =

129th psalm of the book of psalms

- "Many a time have they afflicted me from my youth"
- Song of Ascents
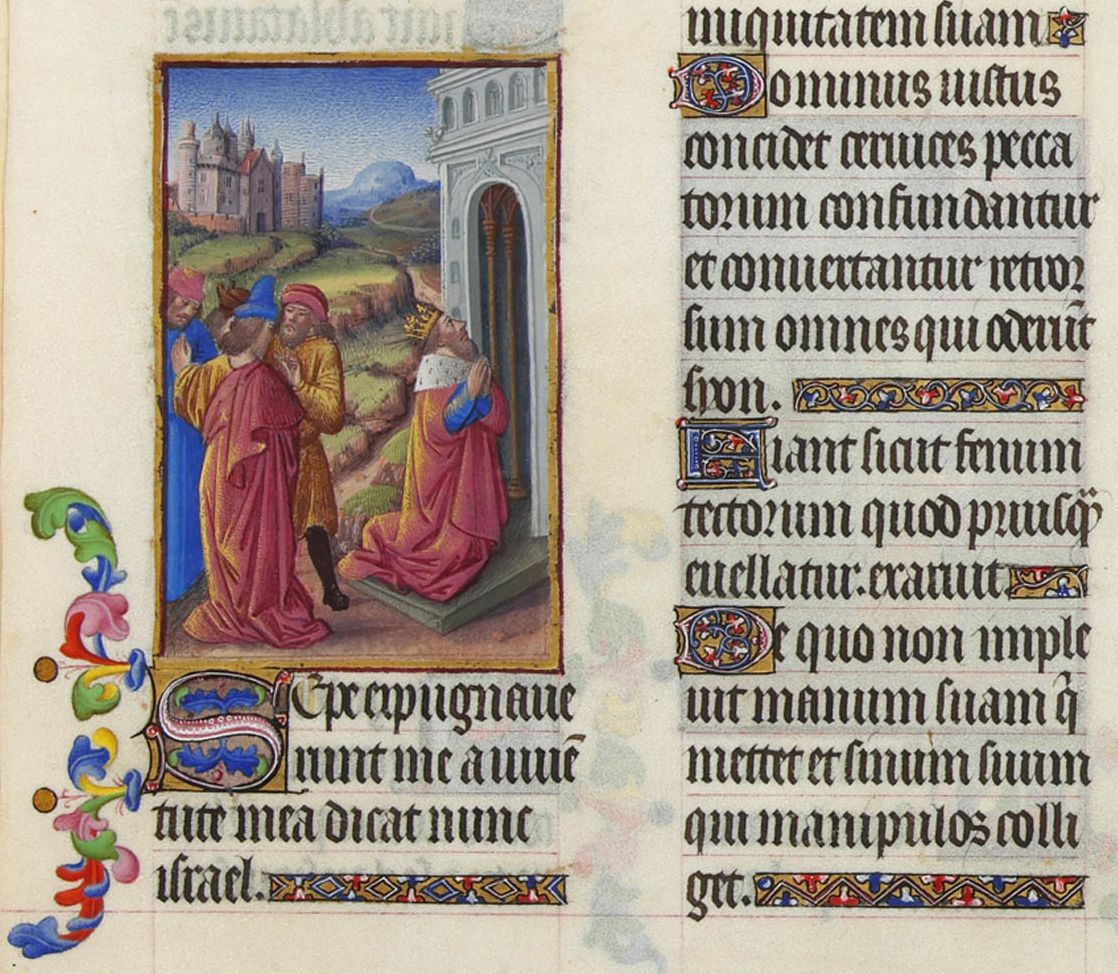
- Beginning of Psalm 129 in Les Très Riches Heures du duc de Berry, Folio 62r
- Other name: Psalm 128; "Saepe expugnaverunt me a iuventute"
- Language: Hebrew (original)

Psalm 129
- ← Psalm 128 Psalm 130 →
- Book: Book of Psalms
- Hebrew Bible part: Ketuvim
- Order in the Hebrew part: 1
- Category: Sifrei Emet
- Christian Bible part: Old Testament
- Order in the Christian part: 19

Psalm 129 is the 129th psalm of the Book of Psalms, beginning in English in the King James Version: "Many a time have they afflicted me from my youth". In the slightly different numbering system used in the Greek Septuagint and the Latin Vulgate, this psalm is Psalm 128. In Latin, it is known as "Saepe expugnaverunt me a iuventute". It is one of 15 psalms that begin with the words "A song of ascents" (Shir Hama'alot). The New King James Version calls it "A Song of Victory over Zion’s Enemies", and the Revised Standard Version calls it a "Prayer for the Downfall of Israel’s Enemies", but Albert Barnes notes that the psalm itself is merely entitled "A Song of Degrees" (i.e. a Song of Ascents) and it is not attributed to any author.

The psalm forms a regular part of Jewish, Catholic, Lutheran, Anglican and other Protestant liturgies.

== Origin ==
Barnes argues that this psalm "would be applicable to many periods of the Jewish history, and it is not of such a nature that it can with certainty be referred to any one of them. There is nothing in it which would forbid us to suppose that it was composed on the return from the Babylonian exile, but there is nothing to fix it definitely to that event ... It would seem probable that it was composed during a time of trouble, of war, or of persecution. Why it was made one of the 'Songs of Degrees' is equally unknown".

== Uses ==
=== Judaism ===
This psalm is recited in some communities following Mincha between Sukkot and Shabbat Hagadol.

=== Catholic Church ===
According to ancient tradition from the Middle Ages, this psalm was sung as the last psalm of the office of vespers on Monday, by the Rule of St. Benedict (530). The tract for Passion Sunday (the fifth Sunday of Lent) incorporates verses 1-4.

In the Liturgy of the Hours now, Psalm 129 is sung or recited on the Thursday of the fourth week of the four weekly cycle of liturgical prayers, and in the Office of the middle of the day.

=== Coptic Orthodox Church ===
In the Agpeya, the Coptic Church's book of hours, this psalm is prayed in the office of Vespers and the second watch of the Midnight office. It is also in the prayer of the Veil, which is generally prayed only by monks.

== Musical settings ==
Heinrich Schütz composed a metred paraphrase of Psalm 129 in German, "Die Feind haben mich oft gedrängt", SWV 234, for the Becker Psalter, published first in 1628.

== Text ==
The following table shows the Hebrew text of the Psalm with vowels, alongside the Koine Greek text in the Septuagint and the English translation from the King James Version. Note that the meaning can slightly differ between these versions, as the Septuagint and the Masoretic Text come from different textual traditions. (Note: A 1917 translation directly from Hebrew to English by the Jewish Publication Society can be found here or here, and an 1844 translation directly from the Septuagint by L. C. L. Brenton can be found here. Both translations are in the public domain.) In the Septuagint, this psalm is numbered Psalm 128.

| # | Hebrew | English | Greek |
|---|---|---|---|
| 1 | שִׁ֗יר הַֽמַּ֫עֲל֥וֹת רַ֭בַּת צְרָר֣וּנִי מִנְּעוּרַ֑י יֹאמַר־נָ֝֗א יִשְׂרָאֵֽל׃ | (A Song of degrees.) Many a time have they afflicted me from my youth, may Israel now say: | ᾿ῼδὴ τῶν ἀναβαθμῶν. - ΠΛΕΟΝΑΚΙΣ ἐπολέμησάν με ἐκ νεότητός μου, εἰπάτω δὴ ᾿Ισραήλ· |
| 2 | רַ֭בַּת צְרָר֣וּנִי מִנְּעוּרָ֑י גַּ֝֗ם לֹא־יָ֥כְלוּ לִֽי׃ | Many a time have they afflicted me from my youth: yet they have not prevailed against me. | πλεονάκις ἐπολέμησάν με ἐκ νεότητός μου, καὶ γὰρ οὐκ ἠδυνήθησάν μοι. |
| 3 | עַל־גַּ֭בִּי חָרְשׁ֣וּ חֹרְשִׁ֑ים הֶ֝אֱרִ֗יכוּ (למענותם) [לְמַעֲנִיתָֽם]׃ | The plowers plowed upon my back: they made long their furrows. | ἐπὶ τὸν νῶτόν μου ἐτέκταινον οἱ ἁμαρτωλοί, ἐμάκρυναν τὴν ἀνομίαν αὐτῶν. |
| 4 | יְהֹוָ֥ה צַדִּ֑יק קִ֝צֵּ֗ץ עֲב֣וֹת רְשָׁעִֽים׃ | The LORD is righteous: he hath cut asunder the cords of the wicked. | Κύριος δίκαιος συνέκοψεν αὐχένας ἁμαρτωλῶν. |
| 5 | יֵ֭בֹשׁוּ וְיִסֹּ֣גוּ אָח֑וֹר כֹּ֝֗ל שֹׂנְאֵ֥י צִיּֽוֹן׃ | Let them all be confounded and turned back that hate Zion. | αἰσχυνθήτωσαν καὶ ἀποστραφήτωσαν εἰς τὰ ὀπίσω πάντες οἱ μισοῦντες Σιών. |
| 6 | יִ֭הְיוּ כַּחֲצִ֣יר גַּגּ֑וֹת שֶׁקַּדְמַ֖ת שָׁלַ֣ף יָבֵֽשׁ׃ | Let them be as the grass upon the housetops, which withereth afore it groweth up: | γενηθήτωσαν ὡσεὶ χόρτος δωμάτων, ὃς πρὸ τοῦ ἐκσπασθῆναι ἐξηράνθη· |
| 7 | שֶׁלֹּ֤א מִלֵּ֖א כַפּ֥וֹ קוֹצֵ֗ר וְחִצְנ֥וֹ מְעַמֵּֽר׃ | Wherewith the mower filleth not his hand; nor he that bindeth sheaves his bosom. | οὗ οὐκ ἐπλήρωσε τὴν χεῖρα αὐτοῦ ὁ θερίζων καὶ τὸν κόλπον αὐτοῦ ὁ τὰ δράγματα συλλέγων, |
| 8 | וְלֹ֤א אָמְר֨וּ ׀ הָעֹבְרִ֗ים בִּרְכַּֽת־יְהֹוָ֥ה אֲלֵיכֶ֑ם בֵּרַ֥כְנוּ אֶ֝תְכֶ֗ם בְּשֵׁ֣ם יְהֹוָֽה׃ | Neither do they which go by say, The blessing of the LORD be upon you: we bless you in the name of the LORD. | καὶ οὐκ εἶπαν οἱ παράγοντες· εὐλογία Κυρίου ἐφ᾿ ὑμᾶς, εὐλογήκαμεν ὑμᾶς ἐν ὀνόματι Κυρίου. |
