= Psalm 131 =

131st psalm of the book of psalms

- "Lord, my heart is not haughty"
- Song of Ascents
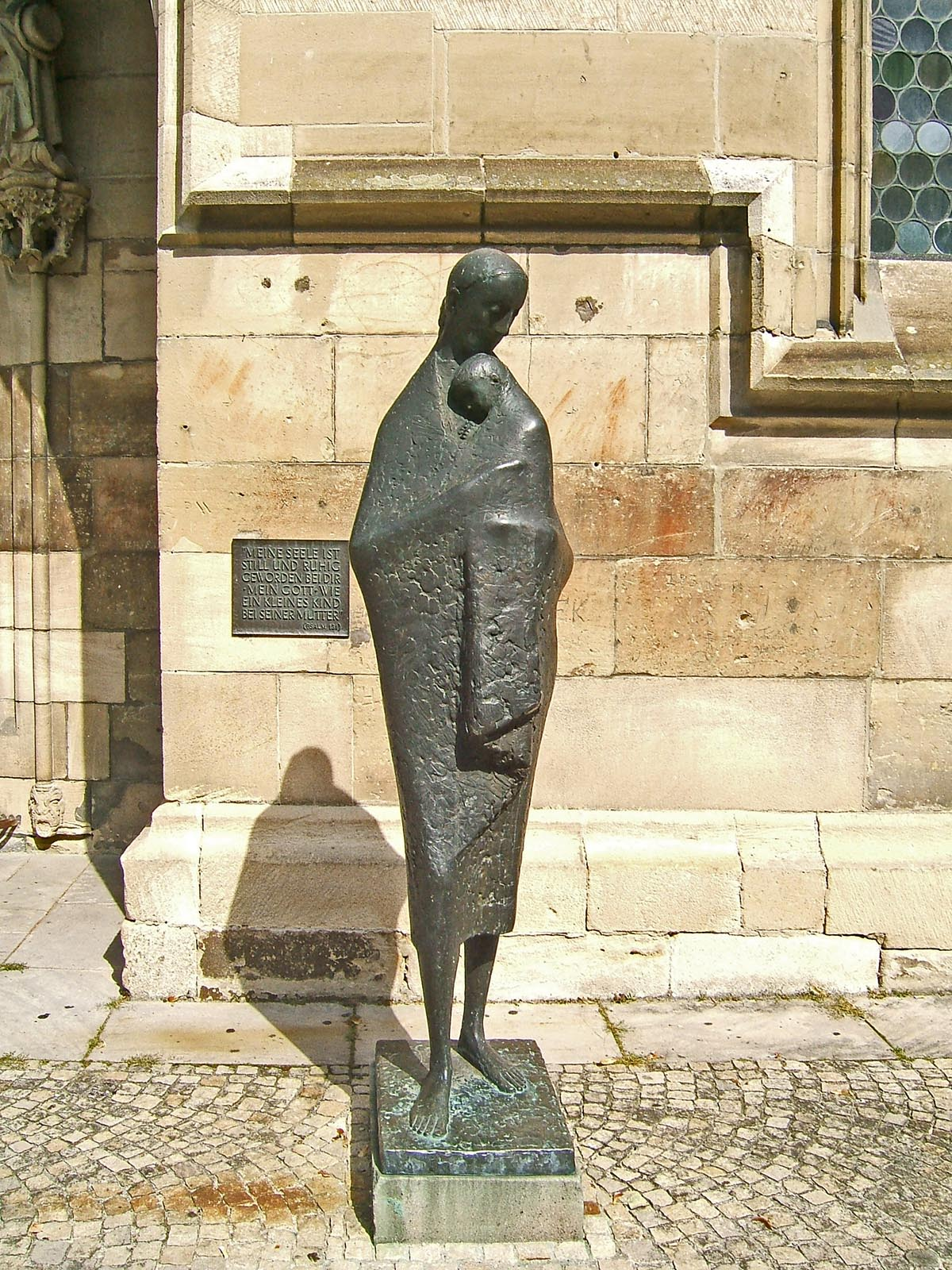
- Mother with Child sculpture by Fritz Nuss, with plaque quoting verse 2, in Schorndorf, Germany
- Other name: Psalm 130; "Domine non est exaltatum cor meum"
- Language: Hebrew (original)

Psalm 131
- ← Psalm 130 Psalm 132 →
- Book: Book of Psalms
- Hebrew Bible part: Ketuvim
- Order in the Hebrew part: 1
- Category: Sifrei Emet
- Christian Bible part: Old Testament
- Order in the Christian part: 19

Psalm 131 is the 131st psalm of the Book of Psalms, beginning in English in the King James Version: "Lord, my heart is not haughty". In Latin, it is known as "Domine non est exaltatum cor meum". In the slightly different numbering system used in the Greek Septuagint version of the bible and in the Latin Vulgate, this psalm is Psalm 130.

The psalm is one of the fifteen Songs of Ascents (Shir Hama'alot), and one of three psalms consisting of only three verses. It is attributed to David and is classified among the psalms of confidence.

The psalm forms a regular part of Jewish, Catholic, Lutheran, Anglican and other Protestant liturgies. It has often been set to music, notably by Heinrich Schütz and in the final movement of Bernstein's Chichester Psalms.

== Background ==
Psalm 131 is one of the shortest chapters in the Book of Psalms, being one of three psalms with only three verses (the others are Psalms 133 and 134). The shortest psalm is Psalm 117, with two verses. Psalm 131 is classified among the psalms of confidence.

== Themes ==
Charles Spurgeon notes that this psalm is both by and about David, expressing his humility, his confidence, and his commitment to perform the will of God. The Midrash pairs the phrases in verse 1 with specific events in David's life that he could certainly have bragged about, yet he retained his humility. These events were:

- "My heart was not haughty" – when Samuel anointed me king
- "nor were my eyes lofty" – when I slew Goliath
- "neither did I swagger about" – when I was restored to my kingship
- "nor did I accept as my due things too high for me" – when I had the Ark of God brought up out of Philistine captivity

When asked what it means to trust in God, the Vilna Gaon quoted verse 2 of this psalm. He explained that just as a nursing baby that is satiated doesn't worry whether there will be more milk for him when he is hungry again, one who trusts in God does not worry about the future.

The Jerusalem Bible notes a parallel with the words of the prophet Isaiah:

Your salvation lay in conversion and tranquility, your strength in complete trust;
and you would have none of it.

== Uses ==
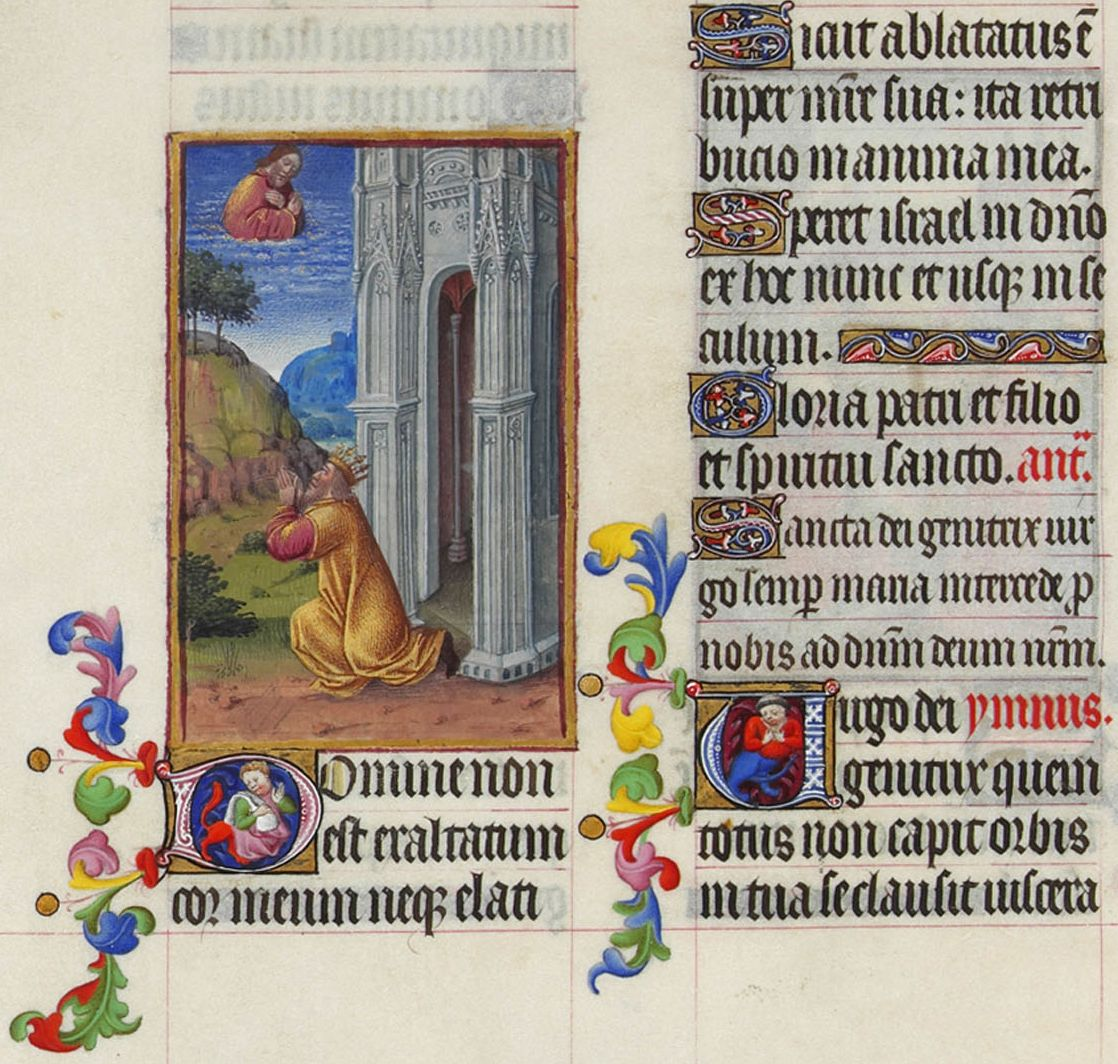
Psalm 131 in Les Très Riches Heures du duc de Berry, Folio 62v - Psalm CXXX (Vulgate) the Musée Condé, Chantilly.

=== Judaism ===
Psalm 131 is one of the 15 Songs of Ascents recited in some communities after the Shabbat afternoon prayer in the period between Sukkot and Shabbat HaGadol (the Shabbat prior to Passover).

=== Catholicism ===
Since the Middle Ages, according to the Rule of St. Benedict (530), it was traditionally recited or sung at the office of vespers on Tuesday between Psalm 130 and Psalm 132.

Currently, in the Liturgy of the Hours, Psalm 131 is in the Office of Readings on Saturday of the first week and vespers on Tuesday of the third week of the four weekly cycle of liturgical prayers. In the liturgy of the Mass, it is recited in the 31st week on Sunday A8, and in the 31st week on Mondays in even years and Tuesdays in odd years.

=== Coptic Orthodox Church ===
In the Agpeya, the Coptic Church's book of hours, this psalm is prayed in the office of Compline and the third watch of the Midnight office. It is also in the prayer of the Veil, which is generally prayed only by monks.

=== Tranquility Meaning In Psalm 131 ===
The psalmist further illustrates tranquility in verse 2: “Surely I have composed and quieted my soul; like a weaned child rests against his mother, my soul is like a weaned child within me.” The weaning process, though initially confusing for a child, ultimately leads to a deeper form of nourishment and maturity. Similarly, the believer’s journey from the “milk” of initial faith to the “solid food” of deeper understanding is a path of spiritual weaning, marked by a serene trust in God’s provision.

Psalm 131 is characterized by themes of humility and contentment. The text contrasts the aspirations of the ambitious with the quiet trust of a child, presenting a model of spiritual submission and internal tranquility.

== Musical settings ==
Heinrich Schütz composed a metred paraphrase of Psalm 131 in German, "Herr, mein Gemüt und Sinn du weißt", SWV 236, for the Becker Psalter, published first in 1628.

Michel-Richard de Lalande composed his great motet for this psalm (s.28) at the end of the seventeenth century, before 1689, for the offices at the royal chapel of the castle of Versailles. In 1691, the work was revised and improved. Heinrich Schütz set the psalm in German for choir as part of his setting of the Becker Psalter as SWV 236, "Herr, mein Gemüt und Sinn du weißt" (Lord, you know my mind and sense).

The psalm in Hebrew is the text of the final movement of Leonard Bernstein's Chichester Psalms, an extended work for choir and orchestra, with verse 1 of Psalm 133 added.

The English composer David Bednall composed a choral anthem titled "O Lord, I am not haughty" using Psalm 131 that was sung by The Queen's College, Oxford choir on their 2018 recording, The House of the Mind.

== Text ==
The following table shows the Hebrew text of the Psalm with vowels, alongside the Koine Greek text in the Septuagint and the English translation from the King James Version. Note that the meaning can slightly differ between these versions, as the Septuagint and the Masoretic Text come from different textual traditions. (Note: A 1917 translation directly from Hebrew to English by the Jewish Publication Society can be found here or here, and an 1844 translation directly from the Septuagint by L. C. L. Brenton can be found here. Both translations are in the public domain.) In the Septuagint, this psalm is numbered Psalm 130.

| # | Hebrew | English | Greek |
|---|---|---|---|
| 1 | שִׁ֥יר הַֽמַּעֲל֗וֹת לְדָ֫וִ֥ד יְהֹוָ֤ה ׀ לֹא־גָבַ֣הּ לִ֭בִּי וְלֹא־רָמ֣וּ עֵינַ֑י וְלֹֽא־הִלַּ֓כְתִּי ׀ בִּגְדֹל֖וֹת וּבְנִפְלָא֣וֹת מִמֶּֽנִּי׃ | (A Song of degrees of David.) LORD, my heart is not haughty, nor mine eyes lofty: neither do I exercise myself in great matters, or in things too high for me. | ᾿ῼδὴ τῶν ἀναβαθμῶν. - ΚΥΡΙΕ, οὐχ ὑψώθη ἡ καρδία μου, οὐδὲ ἐμετεωρίσθησαν οἱ ὀφθαλμοί μου, οὐδὲ ἐπορεύθην ἐν μεγάλοις, οὐδὲ ἐν θαυμασίοις ὑπὲρ ἐμέ. |
| 2 | אִם־לֹ֤א שִׁוִּ֨יתִי ׀ וְדוֹמַ֗מְתִּי נַ֫פְשִׁ֥י כְּ֭גָמֻל עֲלֵ֣י אִמּ֑וֹ כַּגָּמֻ֖ל עָלַ֣י נַפְשִֽׁי׃ | Surely I have behaved and quieted myself, as a child that is weaned of his mother: my soul is even as a weaned child. | εἰ μὴ ἐταπεινοφρόνουν, ἀλλὰ ὕψωσα τὴν ψυχήν μου ὡς τὸ ἀπογεγαλακτισμένον ἐπὶ τὴν μητέρα αὐτοῦ, ὡς ἀνταποδώσεις ἐπὶ τὴν ψυχήν μου. |
| 3 | יַחֵ֣ל יִ֭שְׂרָאֵל אֶל־יְהֹוָ֑ה מֵ֝עַתָּ֗ה וְעַד־עוֹלָֽם׃ | Let Israel hope in the LORD from henceforth and for ever. | ἐλπισάτω ᾿Ισραὴλ ἐπὶ τὸν Κύριον, ἀπὸ τοῦ νῦν καὶ ἕως τοῦ αἰῶνος. |
