= Psalm 132 =

132nd psalm of the book of psalms

- "LORD, remember David, and all his afflictions"
- Song of Ascents
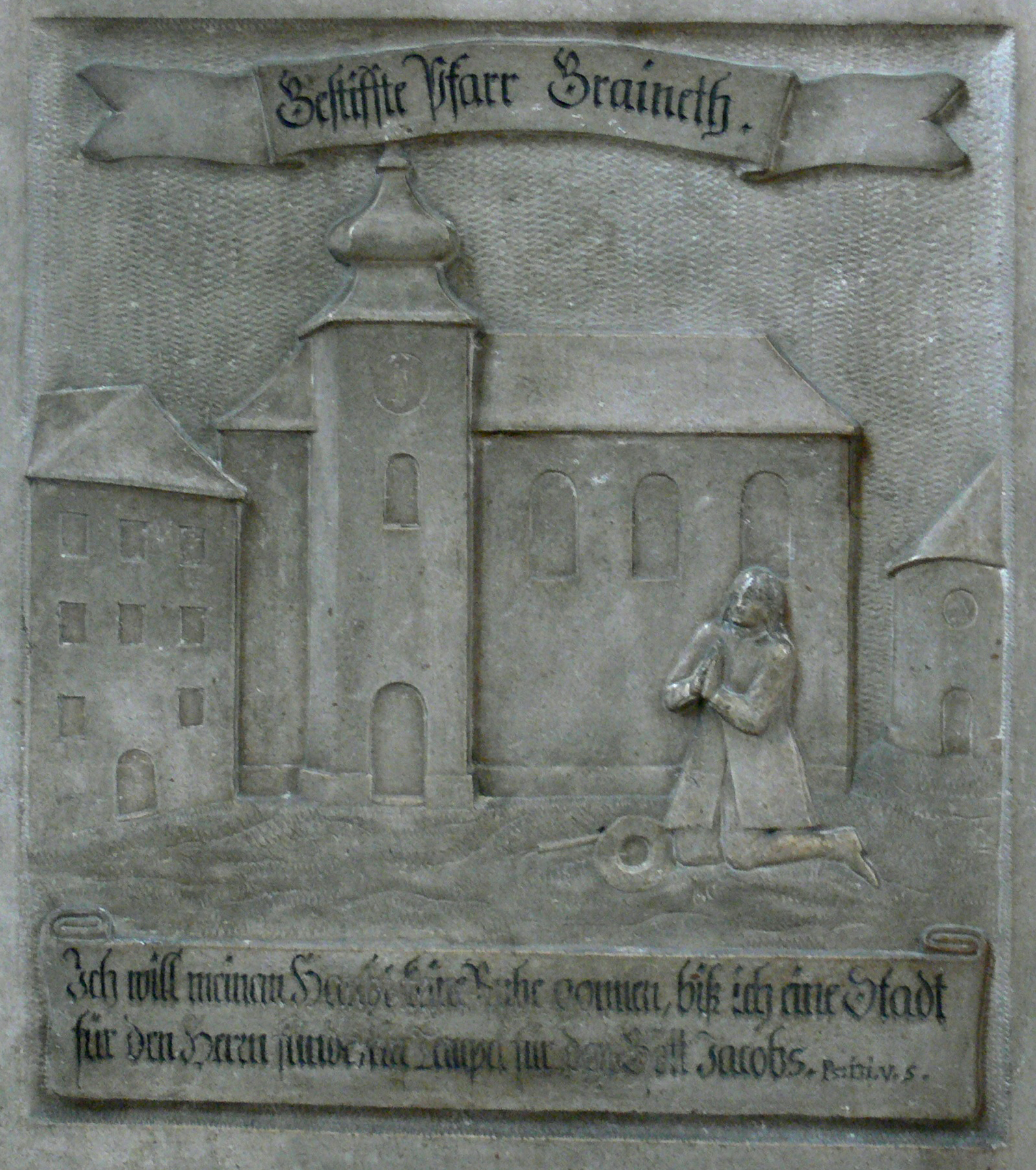
- Verses 4 and 5 on an epitaph for a priest in Passau
- Other name: Psalm 131; "Memento Domine David"
- Language: Hebrew (original)

Psalm 132
- ← Psalm 131 Psalm 133 →
- Book: Book of Psalms
- Hebrew Bible part: Ketuvim
- Order in the Hebrew part: 1
- Category: Sifrei Emet
- Christian Bible part: Old Testament
- Order in the Christian part: 19

Psalm 132 is the 132nd psalm of the Book of Psalms, beginning in English in the King James Version: "LORD, remember David, and all his afflictions". In the slightly different numbering system used in the Greek Septuagint version of the bible and in the Latin Vulgate, this psalm is Psalm 130. In Latin, it is known as "Memento Domine David".

The psalm is one of the fifteen Songs of Ascents (Shir Hama'alot), the longest of these 15 psalms. Its author is not known.

The psalm forms a regular part of Jewish, Catholic, Lutheran, Anglican and other Protestant liturgies.

== Uses ==
=== New Testament ===
In the New Testament,

- Verse 5 is quoted in Acts 7:46
- Verse 11 is quoted in Acts 2:30
- Verse 17 is quoted in the Song of Zechariah in Luke 1:69

=== Judaism ===
- Recited in some communities following Mincha between Sukkot and Shabbat Hagadol.
- Verses 8-10 are among those recited in the late Ashkenazic custom as the Torah scroll is placed in the ark.
- Verse 13 is the fourteenth verse of Yehi Kivod on Pesukei Dezimra.

=== Catholic Church ===
As St. Benedict of Nursia mostly attributed the last psalms to the vespers offices, this Psalm 132 was traditionally sung during the celebration of Vespers on Tuesday, according to the Rule of Saint Benedict, fixed at 530.

In the current Liturgy of the Hours, Psalm 132 is recited at the Office of Readings on the Saturday of the first week of the four weekly cycle of liturgical prayers, and at Vespers on the Thursday of the third week. It is separated into two parts. In the liturgy of the Mass it is read for the feast of the Assumption.

=== Book of Common Prayer ===
In the Church of England's Book of Common Prayer, this psalm is appointed to be read on the morning of the twenty-eighth day of the month, as well as at Evensong on Christmas Day.

=== Coptic Orthodox Church ===
In the Agpeya, the Coptic Church's book of hours, this psalm is prayed in the office of Compline and the third watch of the Midnight office. It is also in the prayer of the Veil, which is generally prayed only by monks.

=== Musical settings ===
Heinrich Schütz composed a metred paraphrase of Psalm 132 in German, "In Gnaden, Herr, wollst eindenk sein", SWV 137, for the Becker Psalter, published first in 1628.

Marc-Antoine Charpentier set the psalm in Latin, Memento Domine, H.155, for soloists, chorus, 2 treble instruments and continuo (c. 1670).

"Let David Be Remembered" was thaxted by Martin E. Leckebusch in 2003

== Text ==
The following table shows the Hebrew text of the Psalm with vowels, alongside the Koine Greek text in the Septuagint and the English translation from the King James Version. Note that the meaning can slightly differ between these versions, as the Septuagint and the Masoretic Text come from different textual traditions. (Note: A 1917 translation directly from Hebrew to English by the Jewish Publication Society can be found here or here, and an 1844 translation directly from the Septuagint by L. C. L. Brenton can be found here. Both translations are in the public domain.) In the Septuagint, this psalm is numbered Psalm 131.

#	Hebrew	English	Greek
1	שִׁ֗יר הַֽמַּ֫עֲל֥וֹת זְכוֹר־יְהֹוָ֥ה לְדָוִ֑ד אֵ֝֗ת כׇּל־עֻנּוֹתֽוֹ׃	A Song of degrees. LORD, remember David, and all his afflictions:	᾿ῼδὴ τῶν ἀναβαθμῶν. - ΜΝΗΣΘΗΤΙ, Κύριε, τοῦ Δαυΐδ καὶ πάσης τῆς πρᾳότητος αὐτοῦ,
2	אֲשֶׁ֣ר נִ֭שְׁבַּע לַֽיהֹוָ֑ה נָ֝דַ֗ר לַאֲבִ֥יר יַעֲקֹֽב׃	How he sware unto the LORD, and vowed unto the mighty God of Jacob;	ὡς ὤμοσε τῷ Κυρίῳ, ηὔξατο τῷ Θεῷ ᾿Ιακώβ·
3	אִם־אָ֭בֹא בְּאֹ֣הֶל בֵּיתִ֑י אִם־אֶ֝עֱלֶ֗ה עַל־עֶ֥רֶשׂ יְצוּעָֽי׃	Surely I will not come into the tabernacle of my house, nor go up into my bed;	εἰ εἰσελεύσομαι εἰς σκήνωμα οἴκου μου, εἰ ἀναβήσομαι ἐπὶ κλίνης στρωμνῆς μου,
4	אִם־אֶתֵּ֣ן שְׁנַ֣ת לְעֵינָ֑י לְֽעַפְעַפַּ֥י תְּנוּמָֽה׃	I will not give sleep to mine eyes, or slumber to mine eyelids,	εἰ δώσω ὕπνον τοῖς ὀφθαλμοῖς μου καὶ τοῖς βλεφάροις μου νυσταγμὸν καὶ ἀνάπαυσιν τοῖς κροτάφοις μου,
5	עַד־אֶמְצָ֣א מָ֭קוֹם לַיהֹוָ֑ה מִ֝שְׁכָּנ֗וֹת לַאֲבִ֥יר יַעֲקֹֽב׃	Until I find out a place for the LORD, an habitation for the mighty God of Jacob.	ἕως οὗ εὕρω τόπον τῷ Κυρίῳ, σκήνωμα τῷ Θεῷ ᾿Ιακώβ.
6	הִנֵּֽה־שְׁמַעֲנ֥וּהָ בְאֶפְרָ֑תָה מְ֝צָאנ֗וּהָ בִּשְׂדֵי־יָֽעַר׃	Lo, we heard of it at Ephratah: we found it in the fields of the wood.	ἰδοὺ ἠκούσαμεν αὐτὴν ἐν ᾿Εφραθᾷ, εὕρομεν αὐτὴν ἐν τοῖς πεδίοις τοῦ δρυμοῦ·
7	נָב֥וֹאָה לְמִשְׁכְּנוֹתָ֑יו נִ֝שְׁתַּחֲוֶ֗ה לַהֲדֹ֥ם רַגְלָֽיו׃	We will go into his tabernacles: we will worship at his footstool.	εἰσελευσόμεθα εἰς τὰ σκηνώματα αὐτοῦ, προσκυνήσομεν εἰς τὸν τόπον, οὗ ἔστησαν οἱ πόδες αὐτοῦ.
8	קוּמָ֣ה יְ֭הֹוָה לִמְנוּחָתֶ֑ךָ אַ֝תָּ֗ה וַאֲר֥וֹן עֻזֶּֽךָ׃	Arise, O LORD, into thy rest; thou, and the ark of thy strength.	ἀνάστηθι, Κύριε, εἰς τὴν ἀνάπαυσίν σου, σὺ καὶ ἡ κιβωτὸς τοῦ ἁγιάσματός σου·
9	כֹּהֲנֶ֥יךָ יִלְבְּשׁוּ־צֶ֑דֶק וַחֲסִידֶ֥יךָ יְרַנֵּֽנוּ׃	Let thy priests be clothed with righteousness; and let thy saints shout for joy.	οἱ ἱερεῖς σου ἐνδύσονται δικαιοσύνην, καὶ οἱ ὅσιοί σου ἀγαλλιάσονται.
10	בַּֽ֭עֲבוּר דָּוִ֣ד עַבְדֶּ֑ךָ אַל־תָּ֝שֵׁ֗ב פְּנֵ֣י מְשִׁיחֶֽךָ׃	For thy servant David's sake turn not away the face of thine anointed.	ἕνεκεν Δαυΐδ τοῦ δούλου σου μὴ ἀποστρέψῃς τὸ πρόσωπον τοῦ χριστοῦ σου.
11	נִשְׁבַּֽע־יְהֹוָ֨ה ׀ לְדָוִ֡ד אֱמֶת֮ לֹא־יָשׁ֢וּב מִ֫מֶּ֥נָּה מִפְּרִ֥י בִטְנְךָ֑ אָ֝שִׁ֗ית לְכִסֵּא־לָֽךְ׃	The LORD hath sworn in truth unto David; he will not turn from it; Of the fruit of thy body will I set upon thy throne.	ὤμοσε Κύριος τῷ Δαυΐδ ἀλήθειαν καὶ οὐ μὴ ἀθετήσει αὐτήν· ἐκ καρποῦ τῆς κοιλίας σου θήσομαι ἐπὶ τοῦ θρόνου σου·
12	אִֽם־יִשְׁמְר֬וּ בָנֶ֨יךָ ׀ בְּרִיתִי֮ וְעֵדֹתִ֥י ז֗וֹ אֲלַ֫מְּדֵ֥ם גַּם־בְּנֵיהֶ֥ם עֲדֵי־עַ֑ד יֵ֝שְׁב֗וּ לְכִסֵּא־לָֽךְ׃	If thy children will keep my covenant and my testimony that I shall teach them, their children shall also sit upon thy throne for evermore.	ἐὰν φυλάξωνται οἱ υἱοί σου τὴν διαθήκην μου καὶ τὰ μαρτύριά μου ταῦτα, ἃ διδάξω αὐτούς, καὶ οἱ υἱοὶ αὐτῶν ἕως τοῦ αἰῶνος καθιοῦνται ἐπὶ τοῦ θρόνου σου.
13	כִּי־בָחַ֣ר יְהֹוָ֣ה בְּצִיּ֑וֹן אִ֝וָּ֗הּ לְמוֹשָׁ֥ב לֽוֹ׃	For the LORD hath chosen Zion; he hath desired it for his habitation.	ὅτι ἐξελέξατο Κύριος τὴν Σιών, ᾑρετίσατο αὐτὴν εἰς κατοικίαν ἑαυτῷ·
14	זֹאת־מְנוּחָתִ֥י עֲדֵי־עַ֑ד פֹּה־אֵ֝שֵׁ֗ב כִּ֣י אִוִּתִֽיהָ׃	This is my rest for ever: here will I dwell; for I have desired it.	αὕτη ἡ κατάπαυσίς μου εἰς αἰῶνα αἰῶνος, ᾧδε κατοικήσω, ὅτι ᾑρετισάμην αὐτήν·
15	צֵ֭ידָהּ בָּרֵ֣ךְ אֲבָרֵ֑ךְ אֶ֝בְיוֹנֶ֗יהָ אַשְׂבִּ֥יעַֽ לָֽחֶם׃	I will abundantly bless her provision: I will satisfy her poor with bread.	τὴν θύραν αὐτῆς εὐλογῶν εὐλογήσω, τοὺς πτωχοὺς αὐτῆς χορτάσω ἄρτων,
16	וְֽ֭כֹהֲנֶיהָ אַלְבִּ֣ישׁ יֶ֑שַׁע וַ֝חֲסִידֶ֗יהָ רַנֵּ֥ן יְרַנֵּֽנוּ׃	I will also clothe her priests with salvation: and her saints shall shout aloud for joy.	τοὺς ἱερεῖς αὐτῆς ἐνδύσω σωτηρίαν, καὶ οἱ ὅσιοι αὐτῆς ἀγαλλιάσει ἀγαλλιάσονται.
17	שָׁ֤ם אַצְמִ֣יחַ קֶ֣רֶן לְדָוִ֑ד עָרַ֥כְתִּי נֵ֝֗ר לִמְשִׁיחִֽי׃	There will I make the horn of David to bud: I have ordained a lamp for mine anointed.	ἐκεῖ ἐξανατελῶ κέρας τῷ Δαυΐδ, ἡτοίμασα λύχνον τῷ χριστῷ μου·
18	א֭וֹיְבָיו אַלְבִּ֣ישׁ בֹּ֑שֶׁת וְ֝עָלָ֗יו יָצִ֥יץ נִזְרֽוֹ׃	His enemies will I clothe with shame: but upon himself shall his crown flourish.	τοὺς ἐχθροὺς αὐτοῦ ἐνδύσω αἰσχύνην, ἐπὶ δὲ αὐτὸν ἐξανθήσει τὸ ἁγίασμά μου.

=== Overview ===
This psalm has 18 verses. The New Revised Standard Version associates it with "the Eternal Dwelling of God in Zion". The Jerusalem Bible describes it as a "messianic hymn" and an "anniversary hymn" recalling the finding and translation of the Ark of the Covenant, which are recounted in 1 Samuel 6 and 2 Samuel 6 in the Hebrew Bible. The words of verse 6, "we heard of it in Ephrathah", refer to the ark.

=== Verse 1 ===
Lord, remember David,
And all his afflictions.

The New International Version refers to David's self-denial. Albert Barnes suggests that the specific afflictions under consideration were "his zeal, his labor, his trials in order that there might be a permanent place for [God's] worship".
