= Psalm 133 =

133rd psalm of the book of psalms

- "Behold, how good and how pleasant it is for brethren to dwell together in unity"
- Song of Ascents
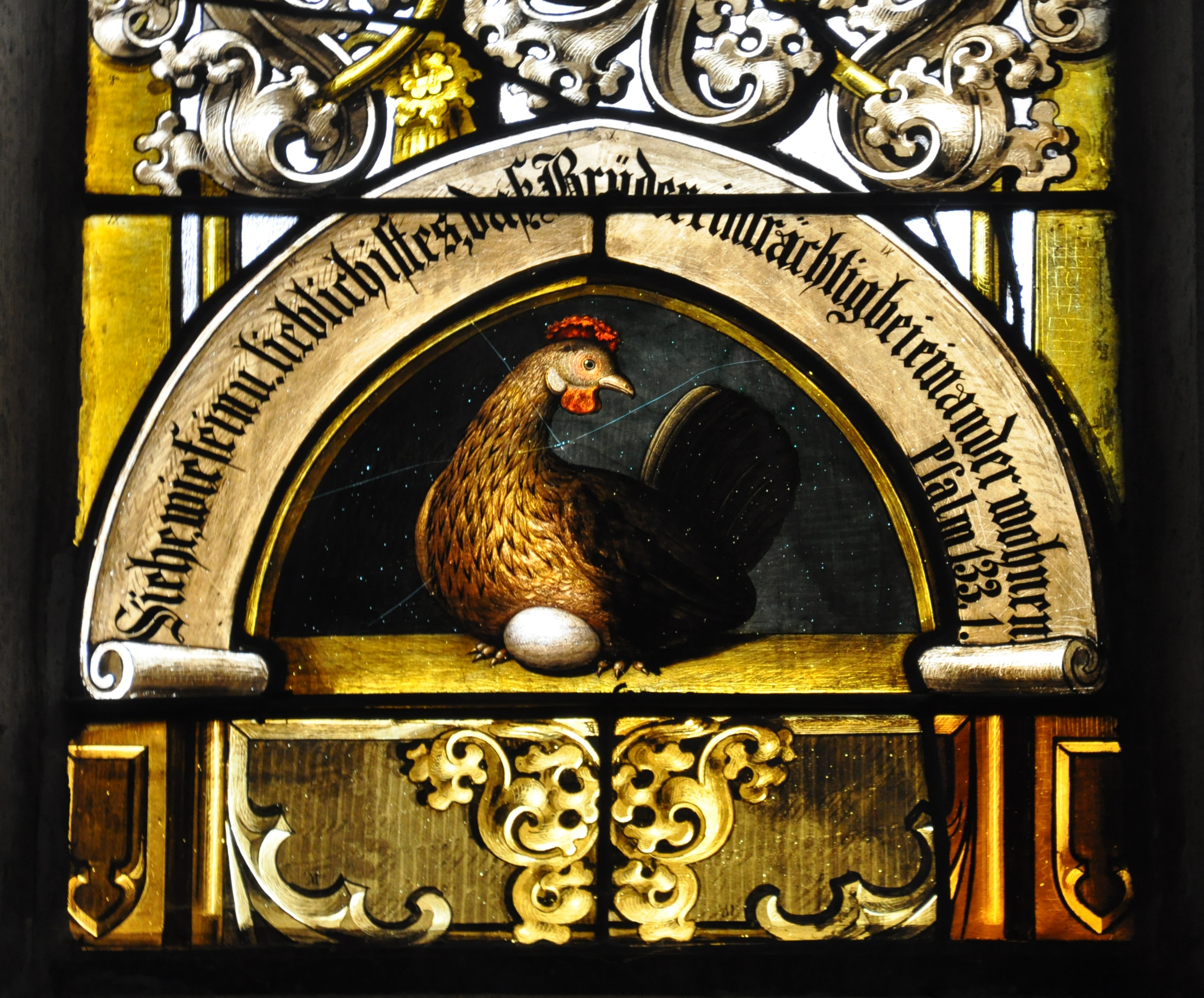
- 19th-century glass windows in the Evangelische Stadtkirche Ravensburg with inscription from Psalms 133:1
- Other name: Psalm 132; "Ecce quam bonum"
- Language: Hebrew (original)

Psalm 133
- ← Psalm 132 Psalm 134 →
- Book: Book of Psalms
- Hebrew Bible part: Ketuvim
- Order in the Hebrew part: 1
- Category: Sifrei Emet
- Christian Bible part: Old Testament
- Order in the Christian part: 19

Psalm 133 is the 133rd psalm of the Book of Psalms, beginning in English in the King James Version: "Behold, how good and how pleasant it is for brethren to dwell together in unity". In Latin, it is known as "Ecce quam bonum". The psalm is one of the fifteen Songs of Ascents (Shir Hama'alot), and one of the three Songs of Ascents consisting of only three verses.

In the slightly different numbering system used in the Greek Septuagint version of the Bible and in the Latin Vulgate, this psalm is Psalm 132.

The psalm forms a regular part of Jewish, Catholic, Lutheran, Anglican and other Protestant liturgies. It has been set to music often, notably by Heinrich Schütz, Friedrich Kiel, and as the conclusion of Leonard Bernstein's Chichester Psalms. Addressing the topic of unity, the beginning of the psalm has been chosen as a motto by universities, as well as a symbol of brotherhood by freemasonry.

== Background ==
Psalm 133 is one of the shortest chapters in the Book of Psalms, being one of three psalms with three verses; the others are Psalms 131 and 134. The shortest psalm is Psalm 117, with two verses.

According to 18th-century theologian John Gill, David may have composed this psalm after he was unanimously crowned as king by the united tribes of Israel, or after his son Absalom's revolt was put down and the tribes hurried to show their loyalty to David. Gill noted that it may also be viewed as prophetic, referring to the reunion of the tribes after the Babylonian captivity, to the unity of the Christians at the time of the Gospels, or to the Messianic Age.

== Themes ==
The themes of brotherly love and unity in verse 1 have been interpreted various ways. Rashi states that when the Jewish people are united, God joins together with them. Matthew Henry suggests that David is directing this call for unity to the sons of his many wives, or to "the benefit of the communion of saints".

Augustine of Hippo saw the psalm's theme of brotherhood as so important that he stated, in what James Luther Mays noted as overstatement, that it gave birth to monasteries—that is, to those communities who wished to live together as brothers. After the Reformation it became part of one order for the celebration of the Eucharist, interpreting the sacrament as constituting a spiritual family, and in the Book of Common Prayer it denotes an idea of unity that simultaneously can function to exclude others, according to Mays.

The Midrash interprets verses 1 and 2 in the context of Moses anointing his brother Aaron as High Priest of Israel. According to the Midrash, two drops of the holy anointing oil hung from Aaron's beard like two pearls. Both Moses and Aaron were worried that an error had been made in the anointing ceremony, but a bat kol (heavenly voice) declared, "Behold how good and how pleasant it is for brothers to dwell together in unity" and "Just as Moses did not transgress, neither did you [Aaron] transgress". These verses are also cited in the Talmudic discussion of the possible misuse of the holy anointing oil (Horayot 12a).

Verse 2, which mentions Aaron by name, is cited by Eliyahu Kitov in connection with Aaron's role as one of the seven ushpizin (guests) who visit the sukkah during the holiday of Sukkot.

Mays analyzes the structure of the psalm as follows: v. 1 is an exclamation containing a value statement, followed by two or three similes in vv. 2–3a, and a declaration in 3b that supports the initial statement. The similes are meant to evoke positive associations with "good" and "pleasant", though Mays is puzzled by the reference to "the beard of Aaron"; it is not clear whether it is in apposition to the first mention of "beard", or whether it is a second beard. All similes, Mays says, contain the phrase coming or running down, anticipating the blessing of God that runs down in the last verse. The psalm is the inspiration for the colloquial names for a number of wild plants called Aaron's beard.

== Uses ==
=== Judaism ===
Psalm 133 is one of the 15 Songs of Ascents recited in some communities after the Shabbat afternoon prayer in the period between Sukkot and Shabbat HaGadol (the Shabbat prior to Passover).

Verse 3 is part of the Selichot prayers.

Verse 1 is used as a theme for the Pizmon of Shacharit recited in the Western Ashkenazic rite on Yom Kippur that falls on Shabbat, and the verse itself (without the opening two words) is recited prior to the piyyut.

=== Coptic Orthodox Church ===
In the Agpeya, the Coptic Church's book of hours, this psalm is prayed in the office of Compline and the third watch of the Midnight office. It is also in the prayer of the Veil, which is generally prayed only by monks.

=== Other ===
The Latin title of the Psalm is Ecce Quam Bonum. The first lines, Ecce quam bonum et quam jucundum habitare fratres in unum ("Behold how good and how pleasant it is for brethren to dwell together in unity"), constitute the motto of Sewanee: The University of the South, the Royal Borough of Kensington and Chelsea, Morrissey Hall of the University of Notre Dame, and the Immaculate Heart of Mary Seminary in Winona, Minnesota.

== Musical settings ==
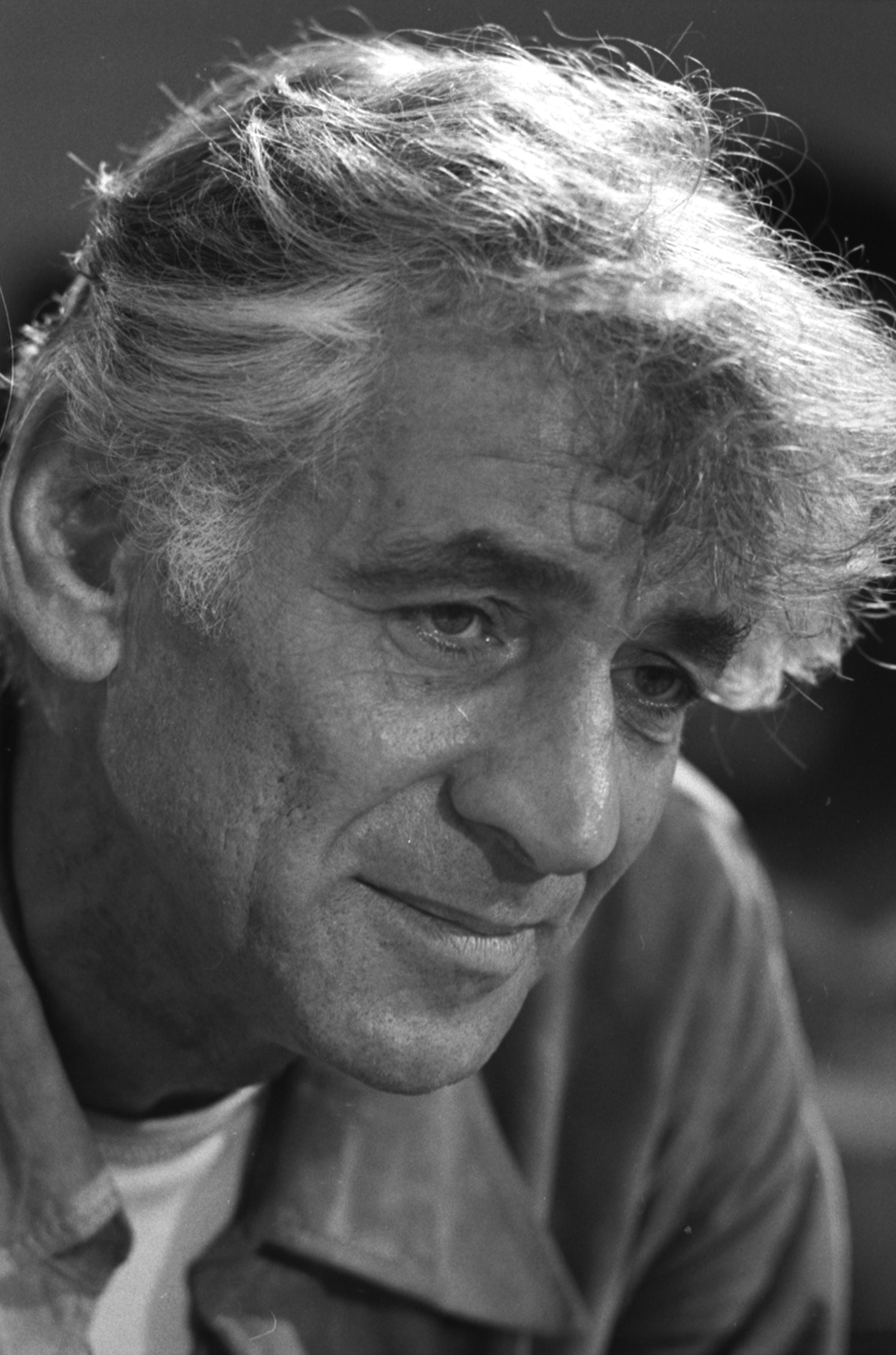
Leonard Bernstein, who chose verse 1 to conclude his 1965 Chichester Psalms

Verse 1, known as Hine Ma Tov ("How goodly") has often been set to music in Judaism: melodies have been composed for congregational prayer, folk singing, and art and choral settings. The verse is also sung as a Shabbat table song.

A Christian hymn in English, "How beautiful the sight", was written based on Psalm 133 by James Montgomery, sung to the tune Old Godric.

In 1571, David Aquinus composed a setting of Psalm 133 for four voices, setting the translation of the Bible by Martin Luther, "Siehe, wie fein und lieblich ist's" (See how fine and lovely it is). Heinrich Schütz set the psalm in German twice, in 1619 as his SWV 48, "Siehe, wie fein und lieblich ist's", for two sopranos, alto, tenor, bass, cornett, violin, violone and continuo, and again for choir as part of his setting of the Becker Psalter as SWV 238, "Wie ist's so fein, lieblich und schön" (How it is so fine, lovely and beautiful).

Franz Paul Lachner wrote in 1849 a setting of the psalm for four female voices a cappella. Friedrich Kiel composed a choral setting of verses 1 and 3, "Siehe, wie fein und lieblich ist es", as No. 2 of his 6 Motetten für gemischten Chor (Six motets for mixed choir), Op. 82, of selected psalm settings, published in 1883. Mikhail Ippolitov-Ivanov set the psalm for choir, together with Psalm 132 as Two evening meal verses in 1899.

Miriam Shatal composed a vocal setting of Psalm 133, verse 3 in 1957.

Donald Wyndham Cremer Mossman (1913–2003) composed a setting for choir and organ titled Ecce, quam bonum! with the incipit "Behold, how good and joyful a thing it is", which became part of The Complete St Paul’s Cathedral Psalter. Herman Berlinski composed in 1980 A Psalm of Unity for mixed choir, organ, soprano, two contraltos and mezzo-soprano based on text from Psalm 140 and Psalm 133. Verse 1 concludes the text in Hebrew of the final movement of Leonard Bernstein's Chichester Psalms, an extended work for choir and orchestra which begins with the complete text of Psalm 131.

== Text ==
The following table shows the Hebrew text of the Psalm with vowels and cantillation marks, alongside the Clementine Vulgate and the Koine Greek text in the Septuagint and the English translation from the King James Version. Note that the meaning can slightly differ between these versions, as the Septuagint and the Masoretic Text come from different textual traditions. (Note: A 1917 translation directly from Hebrew to English by the Jewish Publication Society can be found here or here, and an 1844 translation directly from the Septuagint by L. C. L. Brenton can be found here. Both translations are in the public domain.) In the Septuagint and Vulgate, this psalm is numbered Psalm 132.

#	Hebrew	English	Latin	Greek
1	שִׁ֥יר הַֽמַּעֲל֗וֹת לְדָ֫וִ֥ד הִנֵּ֣ה מַה־טּ֭וֹב וּמַה־נָּעִ֑ים שֶׁ֖בֶת אַחִ֣ים גַּם־יָֽחַד׃	(A Song of degrees of David.) Behold, how good and how pleasant it is for brethren to dwell together in unity!	Canticum graduum David. Ecce quam bonum, et quam jucundum habitare fratres in unum:	᾿ῼδὴ τῶν ἀναβαθμῶν. - ΙΔΟΥ δὴ τί καλὸν ἢ τί τερπνόν, ἀλλ᾿ ἢ τὸ κατοικεῖν ἀδελφοὺς ἐπὶ τὸ αὐτό;
2	כַּשֶּׁ֤מֶן הַטּ֨וֹב ׀ עַל־הָרֹ֗אשׁ יֹרֵ֗ד עַֽל־הַזָּקָ֥ן זְקַֽן־אַהֲרֹ֑ן שֶׁ֝יֹּרֵ֗ד עַל־פִּ֥י מִדּוֹתָֽיו׃	It is like the precious ointment upon the head, that ran down upon the beard, even Aaron's beard: that went down to the skirts of his garments;	Sicut unguentum in capite, quod descendit in barbam, barbam Aaron, quod descendit in oram vestimenti ejus:	ὡς μύρον ἐπὶ κεφαλῆς τὸ καταβαῖνον ἐπὶ πώγωνα, τὸν πώγωνα τοῦ ᾿Ααρών, τὸ καταβαῖνον ἐπὶ τὴν ᾤαν τοῦ ἐνδύματος αὐτοῦ·
3	כְּטַל־חֶרְמ֗וֹן שֶׁיֹּרֵד֮ עַל־הַרְרֵ֢י צִ֫יּ֥וֹן כִּ֤י שָׁ֨ם ׀ צִוָּ֣ה יְ֭הֹוָה אֶת־הַבְּרָכָ֑ה חַ֝יִּ֗ים עַד־הָעוֹלָֽם׃	As the dew of Hermon, and as the dew that descended upon the mountains of Zion: for there the LORD commanded the blessing, even life for evermore.	Sicut ros Hermon, qui descendit in montem Sion. Quoniam illic mandavit Dominus benedictionem, et vitam usque in sæculum.	ὡς δρόσος ᾿Αερμὼν ἡ καταβαίνουσα ἐπὶ τὰ ὄρη Σιών· ὅτι ἐκεῖ ἐνετείλατο Κύριος τὴν εὐλογίαν, ζωὴν ἕως τοῦ αἰῶνος.

=== Verse 3 ===
It is like the dew of Hermon,
Descending upon the mountains of Zion;
For there the Lord commanded the blessing —
Life forevermore.

The King James Version adds "and as the dew" before the reference to the mountains of Zion, thereby distinguishing two sources of dew. Alexander Kirkpatrick states that there is "no justification" for adding these words; "the dew that falls on the slopes of the snow-clad Hermon is particularly copious. Dew is a symbol for what is refreshing, quickening, invigorating." He argues that the psalmist's image is based on Mount Hermon's dew and does not depend on dew also arising on Mount Zion. Equally, he notes that "it need not be supposed that the poet imagined that the dew which fell upon the mountains of Zion was in any way physically due to the influence of Mount Hermon (though it is possible that it was popularly supposed that there was some connexion); all he means is that the life-giving effect of harmonious unity upon the nation is as though the most abundant dews fell upon the dry mountain of Zion." Mount Hermon and Mount Zion (Jerusalem) are about 210 kilometres (130 mi) apart.
