= Psalm 13 =

13th psalm in the Book of Psalms

- "How long, O LORD"
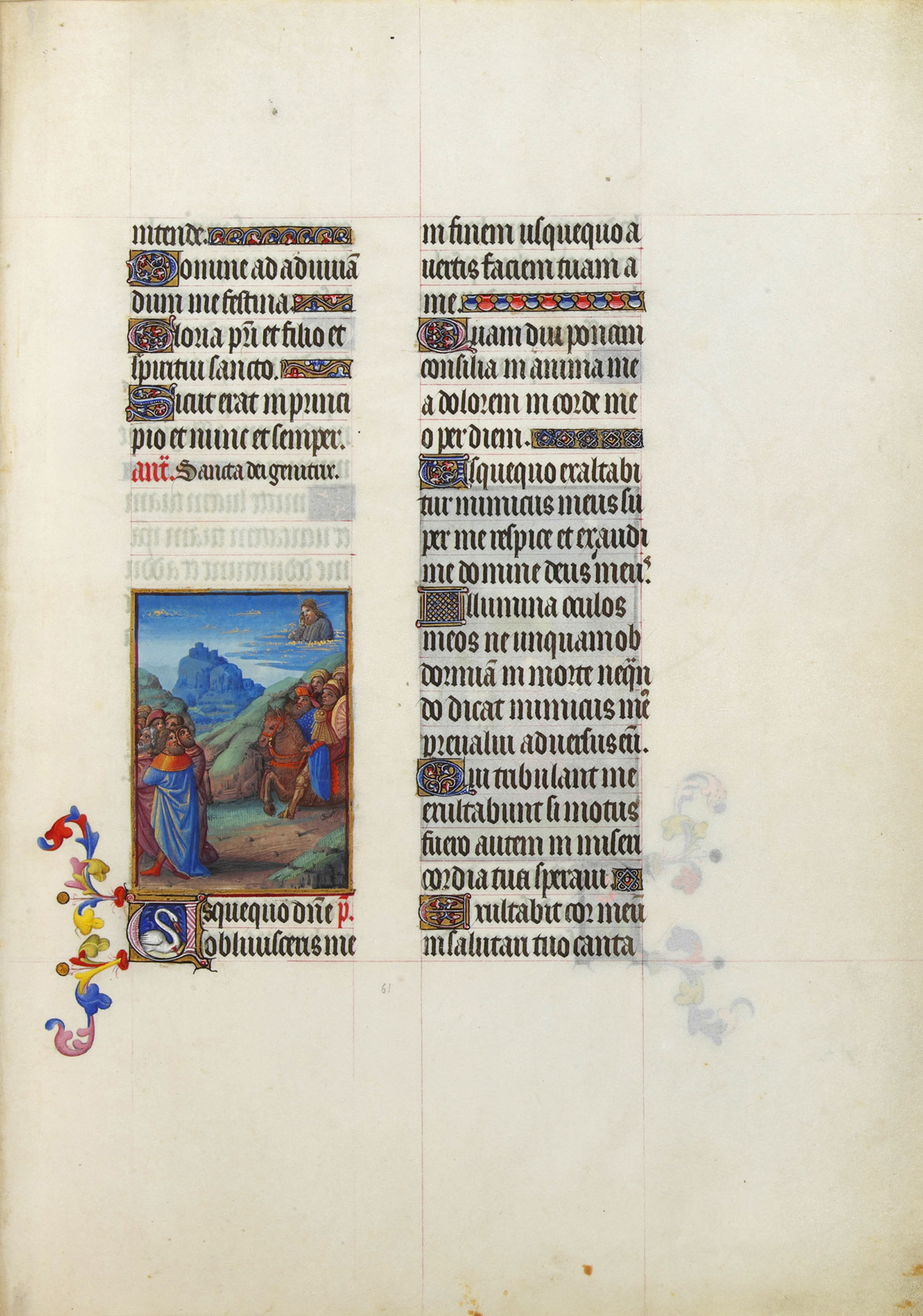
- Psalm 13 in the Très Riches Heures du Duc de Berry
- Other name: Psalm 12 (Vulgate); "Usquequo Domine"
- Language: Hebrew (original)

Psalm 13
- ← Psalm 12 Psalm 14 →
- Book: Book of Psalms
- Hebrew Bible part: Ketuvim
- Order in the Hebrew part: 1
- Category: Sifrei Emet
- Christian Bible part: Old Testament
- Order in the Christian part: 19

Psalm 13 is the 13th psalm of the Book of Psalms, beginning in English in the King James Version (KJV): "How long, O LORD". The Book of Psalms is part of the third section of the Hebrew Bible, and a book of the Christian Old Testament. In the slightly different numbering of the Greek Septuagint and the Latin Vulgate, this psalm is Psalm 12. In Latin, it is also known by its incipit as "Usquequo Domine".

The psalm forms a regular part of Jewish, Catholic, Lutheran, Anglican and other Protestant liturgies.

== Background and themes ==
Theodoret theorized that this psalm was composed by David when his son Absalom conspired against him. However, Charles Spurgeon asserts that any attempt to link it to a specific incident is conjecture; rather, the psalm gives voice to feelings that arise in any of the many trials that a person undergoes in life.

Jewish and Christian commentators note the three-part structure of this psalm, with verses 2–3 in the Hebrew (1-2 in the KJV) relating to David's complaint, verses 4–5 in the Hebrew (3–4 in the KJV) expressing David's prayer, and verse 6 in the Hebrew (5-6 in the KJV) describing David's salvation. A. G. Brown asserts that prayer is the turning point between mourning and rejoicing.

Spurgeon notes that the repetition of the words "How long?" four times in this psalm resemble cries; he creatively refers to this psalm as the "How Long Psalm" or the "Howling Psalm".

== Text ==
The following table shows the Hebrew text of the Psalm with vowels, alongside the Koine Greek text in the Septuagint and the English translation from the King James Version. Note that the meaning can slightly differ between these versions, as the Septuagint and the Masoretic Text come from different textual traditions. (Note: A 1917 translation directly from Hebrew to English by the Jewish Publication Society can be found here or here, and an 1844 translation directly from the Septuagint by L. C. L. Brenton can be found here. Both translations are in the public domain.) In the Septuagint, this psalm is numbered Psalm 12.

#	Hebrew	English	Greek
(Note: In the Jewish verse numbering, the ascription of this psalm is verse 1, and the rest of the psalm begins from verse 2. However, the Christian verse numbering does not count the ascription as a separate verse. With this psalm in particular, however, the KJV also has 6 verses, as the last verse is split in two.)	לַמְנַצֵּ֗חַ מִזְמ֥וֹר לְדָוִֽד׃	(To the chief Musician, A Psalm of David.)	Εἰς τὸ τέλος· ψαλμὸς τῷ Δαυΐδ.
1	עַד־אָ֣נָה יְ֭הֹוָה תִּשְׁכָּחֵ֣נִי נֶ֑צַח עַד־אָ֓נָה ׀ תַּסְתִּ֖יר אֶת־פָּנֶ֣יךָ מִמֶּֽנִּי׃	How long wilt thou forget me, O LORD? for ever? how long wilt thou hide thy face from me?	ΕΩΣ πότε, Κύριε, ἐπιλήσῃ μου εἰς τέλος; ἕως πότε ἀποστρέψεις τὸ πρόσωπόν σου ἀπ᾿ ἐμοῦ;
2	עַד־אָ֨נָה אָשִׁ֪ית עֵצ֡וֹת בְּנַפְשִׁ֗י יָג֣וֹן בִּלְבָבִ֣י יוֹמָ֑ם עַד־אָ֓נָה ׀ יָר֖וּם אֹיְבִ֣י עָלָֽי׃	How long shall I take counsel in my soul, having sorrow in my heart daily? how long shall mine enemy be exalted over me?	ἕως τίνος θήσομαι βουλὰς ἐν ψυχῇ μου, ὀδύνας ἐν καρδίᾳ μου ἡμέρας καὶ νυκτός; ἕως πότε ὑψωθήσεται ὁ ἐχθρός μου ἐπ᾿ ἐμέ;
3	הַבִּ֣יטָֽה עֲ֭נֵנִי יְהֹוָ֣ה אֱלֹהָ֑י הָאִ֥ירָה עֵ֝ינַ֗י פֶּן־אִישַׁ֥ן הַמָּֽוֶת׃	Consider and hear me, O LORD my God: lighten mine eyes, lest I sleep the sleep of death;	ἐπίβλεψον, εἰσάκουσόν μου, Κύριε ὁ Θεός μου· φώτισον τοὺς ὀφθαλμούς μου, μήποτε ὑπνώσω εἰς θάνατον,
4	פֶּן־יֹאמַ֣ר אֹיְבִ֣י יְכׇלְתִּ֑יו צָרַ֥י יָ֝גִ֗ילוּ כִּ֣י אֶמּֽוֹט׃	Lest mine enemy say, I have prevailed against him; and those that trouble me rejoice when I am moved.	μήποτε εἴπῃ ὁ ἐχθρός μου· ἴσχυσα πρὸς αὐτόν· οἱ θλίβοντές με ἀγαλλιάσονται, ἐὰν σαλευθῶ.
5	וַאֲנִ֤י ׀ בְּחַסְדְּךָ֣ בָטַחְתִּי֮ יָ֤גֵ֥ל לִבִּ֗י בִּֽישׁוּעָ֫תֶ֥ךָ אָשִׁ֥ירָה לַֽיהֹוָ֑ה כִּ֖י גָמַ֣ל עָלָֽי׃	But I have trusted in thy mercy; my heart shall rejoice in thy salvation. I will sing unto the LORD, because he hath dealt bountifully with me.	ἐγὼ δὲ ἐπὶ τῷ ἐλέει σου ἤλπισα, ἀγαλλιάσεται ἡ καρδία μου ἐπὶ τῷ σωτηρίῳ σου· ᾄσω τῷ Κυρίῳ τῷ εὐεργετήσαντί με καὶ ψαλῶ τῷ ὀνόματι Κυρίου τοῦ ῾Υψίστου.

== Uses ==
=== Judaism ===
Verse 6 in the Hebrew is recited in the morning prayer service during Pesukei dezimra.

According to the Chasam Sofer and the Siddur Sfas Emes, the entire psalm is recited as a prayer for the well-being of a sick person.

=== Catholic ===
Around 530, St. Benedict of Nursia chose this psalm to be recited for the office of prime on Thursday in the Rule of St. Benedict. In the modern Liturgy of the Hours, Psalm 13 is recited or sung to the Office for Midday Prayer on the Tuesday of the first week of the four-weekly cycle.

=== Coptic Orthodox Church ===
In the Agpeya, the Coptic Church's book of hours, this psalm is prayed in the office of Prime and the first watch of the Midnight office. It is also in the prayer of the Veil, which is generally prayed only by monks.

=== Book of Common Prayer ===
In the Church of England's Book of Common Prayer, Psalm 13 is appointed to be read on the evening of the second day of the month.

== Musical settings ==
Heinrich Schütz wrote a setting of a paraphrase of Psalm 13 in German, "Ach Herr, wie lang willst du denn noch", SWV 109, for the Becker Psalter, published first in 1628. In 1692, Michel-Richard de Lalande wrote his great Latin motet (S. 40) for the offices of the Royal Chapel of Versailles. His contemporary Henry Desmarest also composed a grand motet on this psalm. Marc-Antoine Charpentier set around 1685 one "Usquequo Domine" H.196, for 4 voices, recorder, flutes, and continuo. In German, the psalm was set to music by Johannes Brahms for women's choir in three voices, "Herr, wie lange willst du". Friedrich Kiel set verses as No. 6 of his Six Motets, Op. 82, published in 1883. Franz Liszt scored it for a tenor soloist as the psalmist, mixed choir, and orchestra.

The Canadian Christian singer-songwriter and worship leader Brian Doerksen wrote with others a song called "How long, O Lord".
