= Psalm 130 =

130th psalm of the Book of Psalms

- "From the depths, I have cried out to you, O Lord"
- Penitential psalm
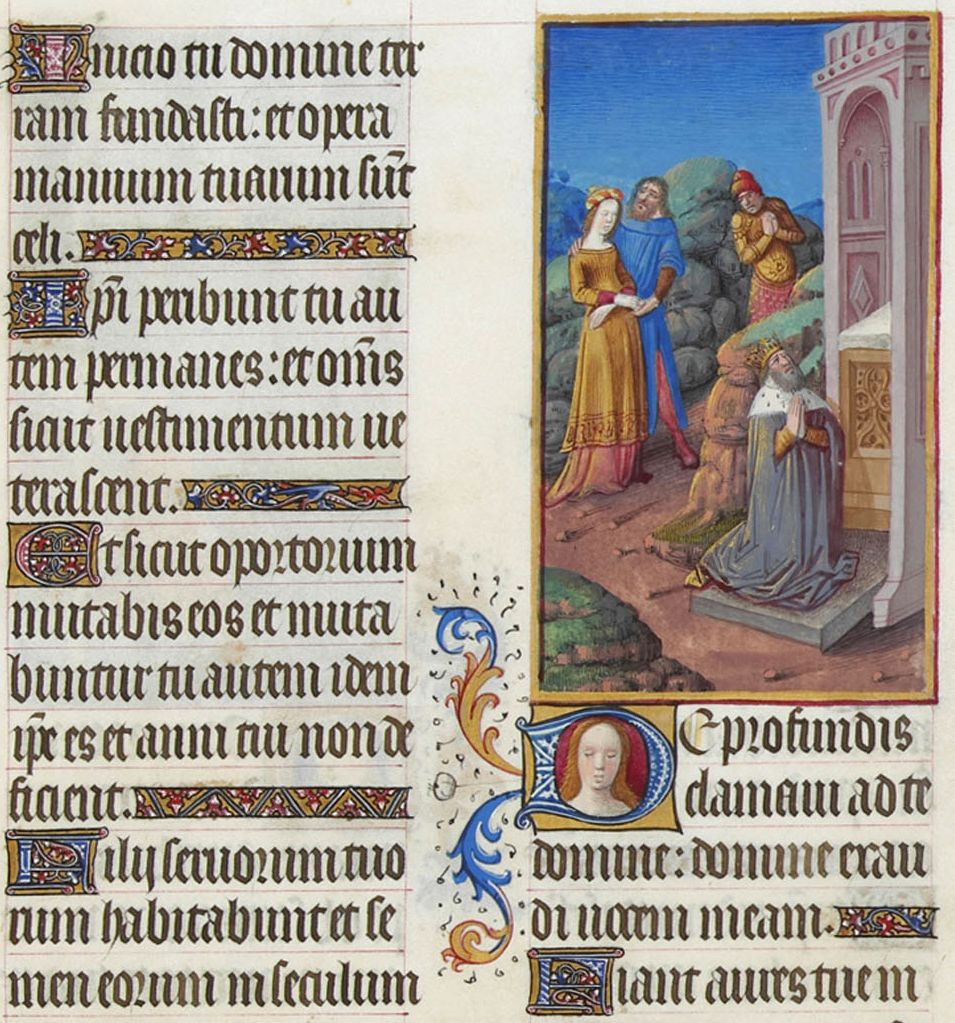
- De profundis, in Les Très Riches Heures du duc de Berry, Folio 70r, held by the Musée Condé, Chantilly
- Other name: Psalm 129 (Vulgate); "De profundis"
- Language: Hebrew (original)

Psalm 130
- ← Psalm 129 Psalm 131 →
- Book: Book of Psalms
- Hebrew Bible part: Ketuvim
- Order in the Hebrew part: 1
- Category: Sifrei Emet
- Christian Bible part: Old Testament
- Order in the Christian part: 19

Psalm 130 is the 130th psalm of the Book of Psalms, one of the penitential psalms and one of 15 psalms that begin with the words "A song of ascents" (Shir Hama'alot). The first verse is a call to God in deep sorrow, from "out of the depths" or "out of the deep", as it is translated in the King James Version of the Bible and the Coverdale translation (used in the Book of Common Prayer), respectively. In Latin, it is known as De profundis.

In the slightly different numbering system used in the Greek Septuagint version of the Bible, and in the Latin Vulgate, this psalm is Psalm 129.

The New American Bible Revised Edition (2010) divides the psalm into two parts: verses 1–4 are a cry for mercy; verses 5–8 are a model expression of trust in God.

The psalm forms a regular part of Jewish, Catholic, Lutheran, Anglican and other Protestant liturgies. It is paraphrased in hymns such as Martin Luther's "Aus tiefer Not schrei ich zu dir" in German. The psalm has often been set to music, by composers such as Orlando di Lasso and Heinrich Schütz. John Rutter set it in English as a movement of his Requiem.

== Liturgical usage ==
=== Judaism ===
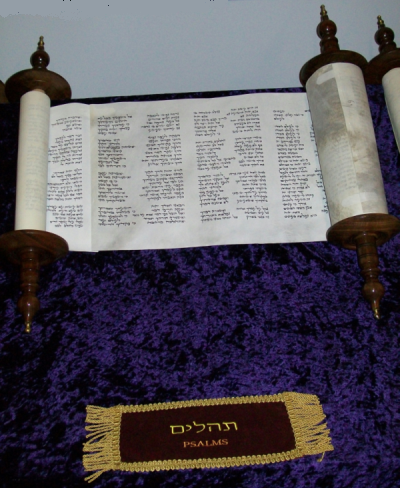
Scroll of the Psalms

Psalm 130 is recited according to Nusach Sefard as part of the liturgy for the High Holidays, sung responsively before the open Torah ark during the morning service from Rosh Hashanah until Yom Kippur. It is not recited in pure Nusach Ashkenaz, although it has been adopted in some Nusach Ashkenaz communities since it is included in the Birnbaum and Artscroll siddurim.

Psalm 130 is one of the 15 Songs of Ascents recited in some communities after the Shabbat afternoon prayer in the period between Sukkot and Shabbat HaGadol (the Shabbat prior to Passover). In some congregations, it is said on every weekday. In Hebrew, it is often referred to as "Shir HaMa'alot MiMa'amakim" after its opening words.

It is recited by some during the Tashlikh prayer.

It is one of the psalms traditionally recited "in times of communal distress".

Verses 3–4 are part of the opening paragraph of the long Tachanun recited on Mondays and Thursdays.

=== Roman Catholic Church ===
==== Ordinary use ====
According to the Rule of Saint Benedict established around 530, the psalm was used at the beginning of the vespers service on Tuesday, followed by Psalm 131 (130).

Psalm 130 came to be associated with the seven penitential psalms which were recited after the hour of Lauds on Fridays in Lent in the medieval Christendom.

In the current Liturgy of the Hours, the psalm is recited or sung at vespers on the Saturday of the fourth week of the four-weekly cycle of liturgical prayers, and on Wednesday evenings. In the Liturgy of the Mass, Psalm 130 is read on the 10th Sunday of Ordinary Time in Year B, on the 5th Sunday of Lent in Year A, (Note: The cycle of Sunday Mass readings takes place over three years.) and on the Tuesday in the 27th Week in Ordinary Time on weekday cycle I. (Note: The lectionary on weekdays follows a bi-yearly cycle, alternating every other year.) It is also used as the entrance antiphon on the 28th Sunday in Ordinary Time.

==== Bell prayer ====
===== Requiem Mass and the prayer for the dead =====
The De Profundis bell is a slow, solemn and measured toll of the bell that marks the end of the day.

In 1610, Pope Paul V established the custom of ringing the De Profundis bell on All Saints' Day.

Pope Clement XII encouraged Christians through his brief Caelestes Ecclesiae thesauros promulgated on August 14, 1736, to pray daily for the souls in Purgatory inviting all to kneel at the first hour of nightfall and devoutly recite Psalm 130 with a Requiem aeternam at the end of it. Pope Pius VI by a rescript of March 18, 1781, granted an equal indulgence to those who should pray the De Profundis in any place where no bell for the dead is sounded. The Catholic tradition became that the De profundis and the versicle Requiem æternam were said after the evening Angelus.

===== Consecration of new bell =====
According to the Rituale Romanum, the recitation of Psalm 130 accompanies the blessing of a new bell in a church or chapel, perhaps because the tolling of a church bell connotes a transition through death to life beyond.

=== Coptic Orthodox Church ===
In the Agpeya, the Coptic Church's book of hours, this psalm is prayed in the office of Compline and the third watch of the Midnight office. It is also in the prayer of the Veil, which is generally prayed only by monks.

=== Book of Common Prayer ===
In the Church of England's Book of Common Prayer, this psalm is appointed to be read on the evening of the twenty-seventh day of the month, as well as at Evensong on Ash Wednesday.

== Literature ==
De Profundis was used as the title of a poem by Spanish author Federico García Lorca in Poema del cante jondo.

A long letter by Oscar Wilde, written to his former lover Lord Alfred Douglas near the end of Wilde's life while he was in prison, also bears the title "De Profundis", although it was given the title after Wilde's death. Poems by Alfred Tennyson, Elizabeth Barrett Browning, Charles Baudelaire, Christina Rossetti, C. S. Lewis, Georg Trakl, Dorothy Parker and José Cardoso Pires bear the same title, as does a novel by Stanisław Przybyszewski.

In the novel Fires on the Plain by Shōhei Ōoka, the character Tamura makes reference to the psalm's first line "De profundis clamavi" in a dream sequence.

== Musical settings ==
This psalm has frequently been set to music. It was sometimes used for funeral services, especially under its Latin incipit "De profundis":

=== Latin ===
- Francesco Barsanti as part of his Sei Antifon
- Nicolaus Bruhns
- Antoine-Esprit Blanchard De profundis (1740)
- Marc Antoine Charpentier:
  - De profundis H.156, for soloists, chorus and continuo (?1670s)
  - De profundis H.189, for soloists, double chorus, flutes, strings and continuo (1683)
  - De profundis à 4 voix H.211, for soloists, chorus and continuo (?early 1690)
  - De profundis H.212, for soloists, chorus and continuo (?early 1690s)
  - De profundis H.213 (?early 1690), H.213 a (1690s), for soloists, chorus and continuo
  - Court De profundis H.222, for soloists, chorus and continuo (?early 1690s)
  - De profundis H.232, for 3 voices, 2 treble instruments and contiuo (date unknown)
- Mikalojus Konstantinas Čiurlionis: cantata
- Michel Richard Delalande: De profundis
- Henry Desmarest: De profundis (before 1704)
- Josquin des Prez
- Jan Dismas Zelenka:
  - De Profundis ZWV 95, A minor, for soprano, alto, tenor, bass, violin, continuo ("violini et oboe colle voce ad libitum") (1728)
  - De Profundis ZWV 96, C minor, for tenor and bass soloists, chorus (SATB), strings and continuo (1727)
  - De Profundis ZWV 97, D minor, for alto, tenor and three bass soloists, chorus (SATB), two oboes, three trombones, strings and continuo (1724)
- Marcel Dupré
- Andrea Gabrieli, as part of his Psalmi Davidici
- Christoph Willibald Gluck
- Charles Gounod De profundis CG 88, for 4 voices, mixed chorus with orchestra (1871)
- Sofia Gubaidulina, De profundis
- Arthur Honegger, slow movement of Symphony No. 3
- Orlando di Lasso, as part of his Penitential Psalms
- Franz Liszt
- George Lloyd
- Leevi Madetoja
- Felix Mendelssohn
- Jean-Joseph Cassanéa de Mondonville (1748)
- Thomas Morley
- Vítězslav Novák
- Terry Oldfield
- Giovanni Pierluigi da Palestrina
- Arvo Pärt: De profundis
- Nicola Porpora
- Henry Purcell
- Joachim Raff: De Profundis, Opus 141, 8-part chorus and orchestra
- Georg Reutter (once attributed to Mozart)
- Pierre Robert
- Pedro Ruimonte
- Marc Sabat
- Antonio Salieri
- Johann Hermann Schein
- Arnold Schoenberg
- Roger Sessions
- Jan Pieterszoon Sweelinck
- Virgil Thomson
- Vangelis
- Jan Dismas Zelenka, ZWV 50
- Patrick Cassidy in his album Famine Remembrance (1997).

Some other works named De profundis but with texts not derived from the psalm are:

- Frederic Rzewski based on the text of Oscar Wilde
- Dmitri Shostakovich, in his Fourteenth Symphony op. 135, to texts of Federico García Lorca translated to Russian

=== English ===
- Leonard Bernstein as part of his Mass
- John Dowland: Lord to thee I make my moan, in Whole Booke of Psalmes
- Alan Hovhaness, for voice and organ (or piano), or soprano, SATB choir, and organ
- John Rutter, as part of his Requiem, in English
- CV Stanford as "A Song of Hope" (Op 113 No. 3)

=== French ===
- Lili Boulanger, Du fond de l'abîme

=== German ===
- Martin Luther: Aus tiefer Not schrei ich zu dir
- Heinrich Schütz: "Aus tiefer Not schrei ich zu dir", SWV 235, for the Becker Psalter (1628).
- J. S. Bach:
  - cantata Aus tiefer Not schrei ich zu dir, BWV 38 (based upon Luther's hymn)
  - cantata Aus der Tiefen rufe ich, Herr, zu dir, BWV 131
- Friedrich Kiel, verses 1–4 as No. 4 of his Six Motets, Op. 82 (1883)
- Lera Auerbach, for mixed choir (also in her opera The Blind)

=== Other ===
- Arne Nordheim (Clamavi for solo cello)
- Simon Steen Andersen (De Profundis for solo soprano saxophone also playing percussion)
- Đuro Živković (in Citadel of Love the second movement 'De Profundis' - for chamber ensemble)

=== Hymns ===
Martin Luther paraphrased Psalm 130 as the hymn "Aus tiefer Not schrei ich zu dir" (Out of deep distress I cry to you), which has inspired several composers, including Bach (cantatas Aus der Tiefen rufe ich, Herr, zu dir, BWV 131 and Aus tiefer Not schrei ich zu dir, BWV 38), Mendelssohn and Reger.

== Text ==
The following table shows the Hebrew text of the Psalm with vowels, alongside the Koine Greek text in the Septuagint and the English translation from the King James Version. Note that the meaning can slightly differ between these versions, as the Septuagint and the Masoretic Text come from different textual traditions. (Note: A 1917 translation directly from Hebrew to English by the Jewish Publication Society can be found here or here, and an 1844 translation directly from the Septuagint by L. C. L. Brenton can be found here. Both translations are in the public domain.) In the Septuagint, this psalm is numbered Psalm 129.

#	Hebrew	English	Greek
1	שִׁ֥יר הַֽמַּעֲל֑וֹת מִמַּעֲמַקִּ֖ים קְרָאתִ֣יךָ יְהֹוָֽה׃	(A Song of degrees.) Out of the depths have I cried unto thee, O LORD.	᾿ῼδὴ τῶν ἀναβαθμῶν. - ΕΚ ΒΑΘΕΩΝ ἐκέκραξά σοι, Κύριε·
2	אֲדֹנָי֮ שִׁמְעָ֢ה בְק֫וֹלִ֥י תִּהְיֶ֣ינָה אׇ֭זְנֶיךָ קַשֻּׁב֑וֹת לְ֝ק֗וֹל תַּחֲנוּנָֽי׃	Lord, hear my voice: let thine ears be attentive to the voice of my supplications.	Κύριε, εἰσάκουσον τῆς φωνῆς μου· γενηθήτω τὰ ὦτά σου προσέχοντα εἰς τὴν φωνὴν τῆς δεήσεώς μου.
3	אִם־עֲוֺנ֥וֹת תִּשְׁמׇר־יָ֑הּ אֲ֝דֹנָ֗י מִ֣י יַעֲמֹֽד׃	If thou, LORD, shouldest mark iniquities, O Lord, who shall stand?	ἐὰν ἀνομίας παρατηρήσῃς, Κύριε Κύριε, τίς ὑποστήσεται;
4	כִּֽי־עִמְּךָ֥ הַסְּלִיחָ֑ה לְ֝מַ֗עַן תִּוָּרֵֽא׃	But there is forgiveness with thee, that thou mayest be feared.	ὅτι παρὰ σοὶ ὁ ἱλασμός ἐστιν.
5	קִוִּ֣יתִי יְ֭הֹוָה קִוְּתָ֣ה נַפְשִׁ֑י וְֽלִדְבָר֥וֹ הוֹחָֽלְתִּי׃	I wait for the LORD, my soul doth wait, and in his word do I hope.	ἕνεκεν τοῦ ὀνόματός σου ὑπέμεινά σε, Κύριε, ὑπέμεινεν ἡ ψυχή μου εἰς τὸν λόγον σου.
6	נַפְשִׁ֥י לַאדֹנָ֑י מִשֹּׁמְרִ֥ים לַ֝בֹּ֗קֶר שֹׁמְרִ֥ים לַבֹּֽקֶר׃	My soul waiteth for the Lord more than they that watch for the morning: I say, more than they that watch for the morning.	ἤλπισεν ἡ ψυχή μου ἐπὶ τὸν Κύριον απὸ φυλακῆς πρωΐας μέχρι νυκτός· ἀπὸ φυλακῆς πρωΐας ἐλπισάτω ᾿Ισραὴλ ἐπὶ τὸν Κύριον.
7	יַחֵ֥ל יִשְׂרָאֵ֗ל אֶל־יְ֫הֹוָ֥ה כִּֽי־עִם־יְהֹוָ֥ה הַחֶ֑סֶד וְהַרְבֵּ֖ה עִמּ֣וֹ פְדֽוּת׃	Let Israel hope in the LORD: for with the LORD there is mercy, and with him is plenteous redemption.	ὅτι παρὰ τῷ Κυρίῳ τὸ ἔλεος καὶ πολλὴ παρ᾿ αὐτῷ λύτρωσις,
8	וְ֭הוּא יִפְדֶּ֣ה אֶת־יִשְׂרָאֵ֑ל מִ֝כֹּ֗ל עֲוֺנֹתָֽיו׃	And he shall redeem Israel from all his iniquities.	καὶ αὐτὸς λυτρώσεται τὸν ᾿Ισραὴλ ἐκ πασῶν τῶν ἀνομιῶν αὐτοῦ.

A marginal note in the Masoretic Text tradition indicates that Psalm 130:2 is the middle of the whole Ketuvim (Book of Writings) section in Hebrew.

=== Latin Vulgate ===
The following table shows the Latin text of the psalm in the Vulgate.

Verse	Latin
1	De profundis clamavi ad te Domine.
2	Domine, exaudi vocem meam. Fiant aures tuæ intendentes in vocem deprecationis meæ.
3	Si iniquitates observaveris, Domine, Domine, quis sustinebit?
4	Quia apud te propitiatio est; et propter legem tuam sustinui te, Domine. Sustinuit anima mea in verbo eius:
5	Speravit anima mea in Domino.
6	A custodia matutina usque ad noctem, speret Israël in Domino.
7	Quia apud Dominum misericordia, et copiosa apud eum redemptio.
8	Et ipse redimet Israël ex omnibus iniquitatibus ejus.

== Sources ==
- Kuttner, Henry (1953). "De Profundis (also known as The Visitors)". Science Fiction Quarterly.
- Leinster, Murray (1945). "De Profundis". Thrilling Wonder Stories.
- Oracz, Michal (2001). De Profundis: Letters From The Abyss. Redhill, Surrey: Hogshead Publishing. ISBN 1-899749-35-7. Archived from the original on 2008-02-25.
