= Psalm 134 =

134th psalm of the book of psalms

- "Behold, bless ye the LORD, all ye servants of the LORD"
- Song of Ascents
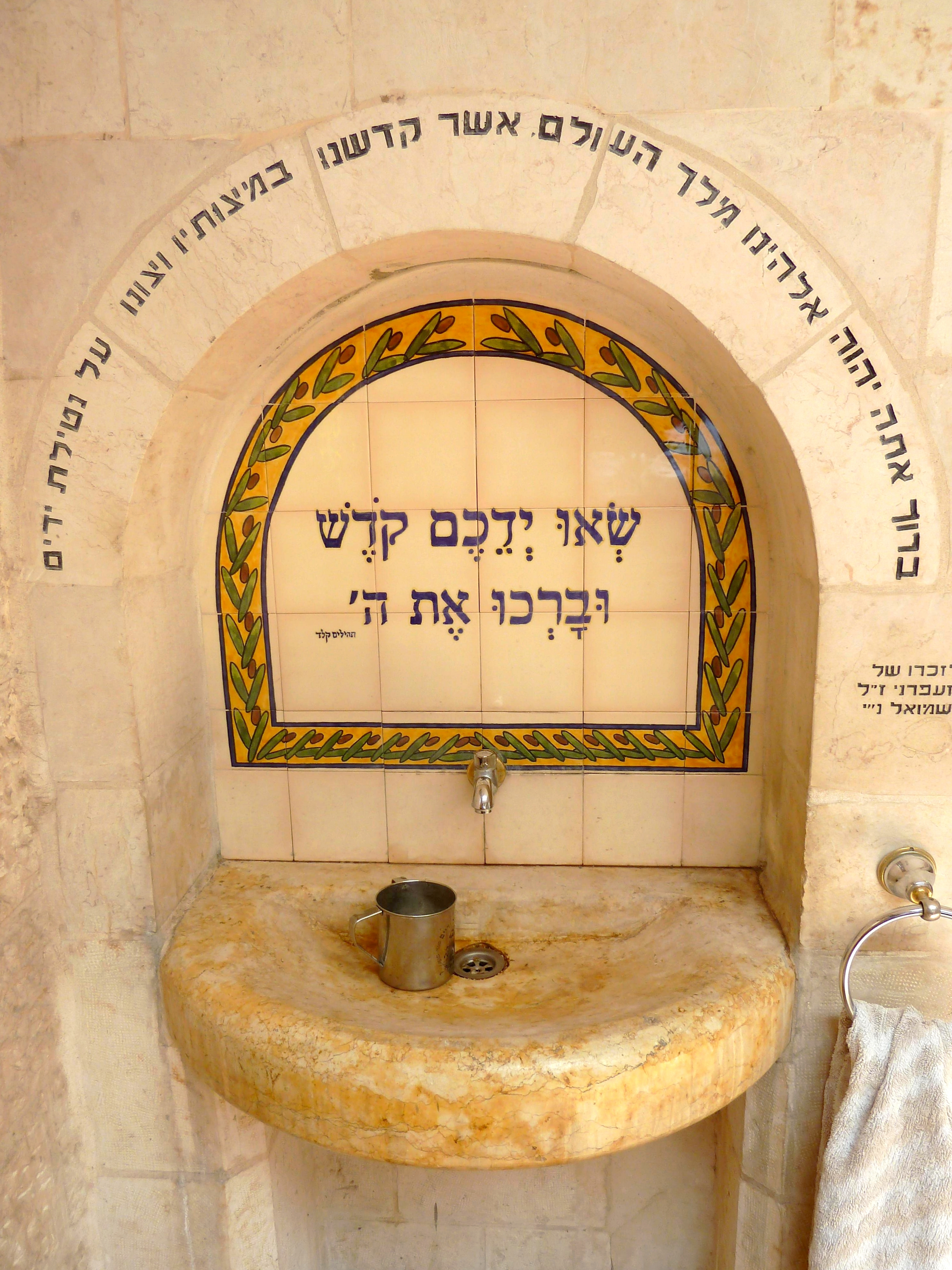
- Verse 2 of the psalm, written above a sink used for ritual hand washing at the Beit El yeshiva, Old City, Jerusalem
- Other name: Psalm 133; "Ecce nunc benedicite Dominum"
- Language: Hebrew (original)

Psalm 134
- ← Psalm 133 Psalm 135 →
- Book: Book of Psalms
- Hebrew Bible part: Ketuvim
- Order in the Hebrew part: 1
- Category: Sifrei Emet
- Christian Bible part: Old Testament
- Order in the Christian part: 19

Psalm 134 is the 134th psalm from the Book of Psalms, a part of the Hebrew Bible and the Christian Old Testament, beginning in English in the King James Version: "Behold, bless ye the LORD, all ye servants of the LORD". Its Latin title is "Ecce nunc benedicite Dominum". It is the last of the fifteen Songs of Ascents (Shir Hama'alot), and one of the three Songs of Ascents consisting of only three verses. The New King James Version entitles this psalm "Praising the Lord in His House at Night".

This psalm is Psalm 133 in the slightly different numbering system of the Greek Septuagint and Latin Vulgate versions of the Bible.

The psalm forms a regular part of Jewish, Catholic, Lutheran, Anglican, Calvinist (Genevan Psalter), and other Protestant liturgies. It has been set to music often and paraphrased in hymns. The short psalm is part of the daily Catholic service Compline, for which settings in Latin were composed by composers such as Tomás Luis de Victoria and Orlando di Lasso. It is frequently used in Anglican Evening Prayer, with settings by John Dowland and Benjamin Rogers, among others.

== Background and themes ==
Nonconformist minister Matthew Henry notes that, as the last of the Songs of Ascents, this psalm serves as a fitting conclusion to the singing of all the Songs of Ascents in the Temple in Jerusalem which took place by the day, as it exhorts "the ministers to go on with their work in the night when the solemnities of the day were over". The psalm could also be interpreted as a "dialogue", as the priests and Levites who served in the Temple are enjoined in verses 1 and 2 to spend their time during the night watch in acts of devotion rather than small talk; and in verse 3 these devotees are urged to pray for the one who enjoined them in verse 1 – either the high priest or a captain of the night guard. A note in the Jerusalem Bible suggests that the dialogue involves pilgrims and temple ministers. Similarly, Baptist preacher Charles Spurgeon posits that verse 1 was recited by the festival pilgrims leaving the temple in the predawn darkness; seeing the guards with their lamps on the temple wall, they bid farewell to these loyal caretakers of the sanctuary. In return, the priests call out their blessing for the departing pilgrims in verse 3. Spurgeon extrapolates from this the need for congregants to pray for those who minister to them, and for ministers to pronounce blessings on their congregations.

The Midrash Tehillim connects the contents of this psalm to several Jewish practices. Rabbi Yochanan says that "servants of the Lord who stand in the house of the Lord at night" mentioned in verse 1 refers to those who engage in nighttime Torah study, which God considers in the same light "as if they occupied themselves with the priest's service in the house of the Lord". The midrash connects the lifting of the hands in preparation for blessing the Lord in verse 2 with the practice of lifting the cup of wine with both hands for the recital of the Birkat Hamazon (Grace after Meals). The midrash further connects this verse to the Priestly Blessing, as Rabbi Simeon ben Pazzi says that a Kohen who has not ritually washed his hands may not lift them to invoke the Priestly Blessing.

The Zohar also explains verse 2 as referring to the kohanim (members of the Jewish priestly class) who bestow the priestly blessing upon the congregation in the synagogue with raised hands. Before pronouncing the blessing, the kohanim must ritually wash their hands. They do not do so themselves; rather, the handwashing is performed by members of the levitical class, "who themselves are holy". If a Levite is not present in the synagogue, a firstborn son pours the water, since he too is called "holy".

== Uses ==
=== Judaism ===
Psalm 134 is recited in some communities following the Shabbat afternoon prayer between Sukkot and Shabbat Hagadol (the Shabbat before Passover). In the Siddur Avodas Yisrael, the entire psalm is recited before the evening prayer on weekdays. The psalm is also recited in full before engaging in Torah study.

Verses 1 and 2 are part of the penitential poetry of Selichot.

During the ritual washing of the hands before breaking bread, some say verse 2 prior to the blessing of al netilat yadayim.

=== Catholic Church ===
The psalm, mentioning "night", forms part of the Benedictine rite of the daily evening prayer Compline. After the Reform of the Roman Breviary by Pope Pius X it was only used on Sundays and Solemnities. In the Liturgy of the Hours it is part of Compline on the eve of Sunday and Solemnities.

=== Coptic Orthodox Church ===
In the Agpeya, the Coptic Church's book of hours, this psalm is prayed in the office of Compline and the third watch of the Midnight office. It is also in the prayer of the Veil, which is generally prayed only by monks.

=== Anglican Communion ===
The Book of Common Prayer translation of the psalm consists of four verses:

1. Behold now, praise the Lord: all ye servants of the Lord;
2. Ye that by night stand in the house of the Lord: even in the courts of the house of our God.
3. Lift up your hands in the sanctuary: and praise the Lord.
4. The Lord that made heaven and earth: give thee blessing out of Sion.

In the Church of Ireland and other churches in the Anglican Communion, this psalm (listed as Ecce Nunc) is also listed as a canticle.

== Musical settings ==
Among the hymns which are based on Psalm 134 is "Come, all you servants of the Lord", which Arlo D. Duba wrote in 1984 to the melody Old Hundredth.

Tomás Luis de Victoria set the psalm in Latin, Ecce nunc benedicite, for double choir. Flemish composer Orlando di Lasso wrote the motet Ecce nunc benedicite Dominum for seven voices a cappella, using a wide range from low bass to very high soprano.

John Dowland supplied a setting in English, "Behold and have regard", to the collection The Whole Booke of Psalmes with works by ten composers, published in 1592 by Thomas Este. Benjamin Rogers set the version in the English Book of Common Prayer, Behold, now praise the Lord, for choir a cappella in the 17th century. Malcolm Hill composed a setting in English for mixed choir and organ in 1996, titled Meditation on Psalm 134.

Heinrich Schütz composed a metred paraphrase of Psalm 134 in German, "Den Herren lobt mit Freuden", SWV 239, for the Becker Psalter, published first in 1628.

== Text ==
The following table shows the Hebrew text of the Psalm with vowels and cantillation marks, alongside the Koine Greek text in the Septuagint and the English translation from the King James Version. Note that the meaning can slightly differ between these versions, as the Septuagint and the Masoretic Text come from different textual traditions. (Note: A 1917 translation directly from Hebrew to English by the Jewish Publication Society can be found here or here, and an 1844 translation directly from the Septuagint by L. C. L. Brenton can be found here. Both translations are in the public domain.) In the Septuagint, this psalm is numbered Psalm 133.

#	Hebrew	English	Greek
1	שִׁ֗יר הַֽמַּ֫עֲל֥וֹת הִנֵּ֤ה ׀ בָּרְכ֣וּ אֶת־יְ֭הֹוָה כׇּל־עַבְדֵ֣י יְהֹוָ֑ה הָעֹמְדִ֥ים בְּבֵית־יְ֝הֹוָ֗ה בַּלֵּילֽוֹת׃	(A Song of degrees.) Behold, bless ye the LORD, all ye servants of the LORD, which by night stand in the house of the LORD.	᾿ῼδὴ τῶν ἀναβαθμῶν. - ΙΔΟΥ δὴ εὐλογεῖτε τὸν Κύριον, πάντες οἱ δοῦλοι Κυρίου οἱ ἑστῶτες ἐν οἴκῳ Κυρίου, ἐν αὐλαῖς οἴκου Θεοῦ ἡμῶν.
2	שְׂאֽוּ־יְדֵכֶ֥ם קֹ֑דֶשׁ וּ֝בָרְכ֗וּ אֶת־יְהֹוָֽה׃	Lift your hands in the sanctuary, and bless the LORD.	ἐν ταῖς νυξὶν ἐπάρατε τὰς χεῖρας ὑμῶν εἰς τὰ ἅγια καὶ εὐλογεῖτε τὸν Κύριον.
3	יְבָרֶכְךָ֣ יְ֭הֹוָה מִצִּיּ֑וֹן עֹ֝שֵׂ֗ה שָׁמַ֥יִם וָאָֽרֶץ׃	The LORD that made heaven and earth bless thee out of Zion.	εὐλογήσαι σε Κύριος ἐκ Σιὼν ὁ ποιήσας τὸν οὐρανὸν καὶ τὴν γῆν.
