= Chichester Psalms =

Choral composition by Leonard Bernstein

- Choral composition by Leonard Bernstein
- First page of the vocal score, Boosey & Hawkes edition
- Occasion: 1965 Southern Cathedrals Festival at Chichester Cathedral
- Text: Psalms 100, 108, 2, 23, 131, 133
- Language: Hebrew
- Performed: 15 July 1965: New York City
- Movements: three
- Scoring: boy treble; choir; orchestra

Chichester Psalms is an extended choral composition in three movements by Leonard Bernstein for boy treble or countertenor, choir and orchestra. The text was arranged by the composer from the Book of Psalms in the original Hebrew. Part 1 uses Psalms 100 and 108, Part 2 uses 2 and 23, and Part 3 uses 131 and 133. Bernstein scored the work for a reduced orchestra, but also made a version for an even smaller ensemble of organ, one harp, and percussion.

The work premiered at the Philharmonic Hall in New York City on 15 July 1965, conducted by the composer. That was followed by a performance at Chichester Cathedral as part of the Southern Cathedrals Festival, for which it was commissioned, on 31 July that year, conducted by John Birch.

== History ==
The work was commissioned for the 1965 Southern Cathedrals Festival at Chichester Cathedral by the cathedral's Dean, Walter Hussey. However, the world premiere took place in the Philharmonic Hall, New York, on 15 July 1965 with the composer conducting, followed by the performance at Chichester on July 31, 1965, conducted by the cathedral's Organist and Master of the Choristers, John Birch.

The first performance in London took place on 10 June 1966 in the Duke's Hall of the Royal Academy of Music. Conducted by Roy Wales and performed by the London Academic Orchestra and London Student Chorale, it was paired with Britten's Cantata academica.

Chichester Psalms was Bernstein's first composition after his 1963 Third Symphony (Kaddish). These two works are his two most overtly Jewish compositions. While both works have a chorus singing texts in Hebrew, the Kaddish Symphony has been described as a work often at the edge of despair, while Chichester Psalms is affirmative and serene at times.

On 24 November 2018, as the finale of the Bernstein in Chichester celebrations to mark the centenary of Bernstein's birth, the choirs of Chichester Cathedral, Winchester Cathedral and Salisbury Cathedral again joined forces to sing Chichester Psalms in Chichester Cathedral. They were accompanied by the Bournemouth Symphony Orchestra conducted by Marin Alsop, a former pupil of Bernstein. The treble solo was sung by the Chichester Head Chorister, Jago Brazier. Alexander Bernstein, Bernstein's son, was in the audience, as he had been in 1965.

In its 60th anniversary year Chichester Cathedral mounted a concert to celebrate this work. The concert, in May 2025, included other works, including a new commission 'A Psalm for Chichester' by Joanna Marsh, written to complement the Chichester Psalms. To coincide with this event, the Bernstein in Chichester society commissioned a plaque to celebrate the connection between Bernstein and Chichester. The plaque, by stone carver Rob Jolly, was unveiled by Patricia Routledge on 17 May 2025.

== Text and music ==
Bernstein made his own selection from the psalms, and decided to retain the original Hebrew for an ecumenical message, focused on the "brotherhood of Man".

=== Introduction ===
Psalm 108 (verse 2 in the King James Version; verse 3 in Hebrew)

עוּרָה, הַנֵּבֶל וְכִנּוֹר;
אָעִירָה שָּׁחַר.

Urah, hanevel, v'chinor!
A-irah shaḥar

Awake, psaltery and harp:
I will rouse the dawn!

The introduction (presented in the score as part of movement one) begins gathering energy. Word painting is used in that the dissonant sevenths present in every chord sound like clanging bells, indicating that we are being told to awaken in a deep and profound way. In the first measure, Bernstein also introduces a leitmotif in the soprano and alto parts consisting of a descending perfect fourth, ascending minor seventh, and descending perfect fifth. The motif is also found with the seventh inverted as a descending major second. It conjures up images of tuning the harp and psaltery (especially the use of perfect fourths and fifths). This leitmotif is found elsewhere in the work, including the end of the first movement ("Ki tov Adonai," m. 109–116), the third movement prelude, and in the soprano part of the final a cappella section of movement three ("Hineh mah tov," m.60), with a haunting reintroduction of the material in the harp on unison G's during the "Amen" of m. 64.

=== First movement ===
Psalm 100

הָרִיעוּ לַיהוָה, כָּל־הָאָרֶץ.
עִבְדוּ אֶת־יְהוָה בְּשִׂמְחָה;
בֹּאוּ לְפָנָיו, בִּרְנָנָה.
דְּעוּ-- כִּי יְהוָה, הוּא אֱלֹהִים:
הוּא־עָשָׂנוּ, ולא (וְלוֹ) אֲנַחְנוּ--
עַמּוֹ, וְצֹאן מַרְעִיתוֹ.
בֹּאוּ שְׁעָרָיו, בְּתוֹדָה--
חֲצֵרֹתָיו בִּתְהִלָּה;
הוֹדוּ־לוֹ, בָּרְכוּ שְׁמוֹ.
כִּי־טוֹב יְהוָה, לְעוֹלָם חַסְדּוֹ;
וְעַד־דֹּר וָדֹר, אֱמוּנָתוֹ.

Hari'u l'Adonai kol ha'arets.
Iv'du et Adonai b'simḥa
Bo'u l'fanav bir'nanah.
D'u ki Adonai Hu Elohim.
Hu asanu v'lo anaḥnu.
Amo v'tson mar'ito.
Bo'u sh'arav b'todah,
Ḥatseirotav bit'hilah,
Hodu lo, bar'chu sh'mo.
Ki tov Adonai, l'olam ḥas'do,
V'ad dor vador emunato.

Make a joyful noise unto the Lord all ye lands.
Serve the Lord with gladness.
Come before His presence with singing.
Know that the Lord, He is God.
He made us, and we are his.
We are His people and the sheep of His pasture.
Come unto His gates with thanksgiving,
And into His court with praise.
Be thankful unto Him and bless His name.
the Lord is good, His mercy everlasting
And His truth endureth to all generations.

The first movement is in a joyous 7/4 meter, sung in a festive fashion, as is implored in the first verse of the psalm. Its last words, "Ki tov Adonai," recall the 7th interval presented as the main theme in the introduction. The music progresses in three asymmetrical beats, with the groupings shown by the composer as 2+2+3.

=== Second movement ===
יְהוָה רֹעִי, לֹא אֶחְסָר.
בִּנְאוֹת דֶּשֶׁא, יַרְבִּיצֵנִי;
עַל-מֵי מְנֻחוֹת יְנַהֲלֵנִי.
נַפְשִׁי יְשׁוֹבֵב;
יַנְחֵנִי בְמַעְגְּלֵי־צֶדֶק,
לְמַעַן שְׁמוֹ.

גַּם כִּי־אֵלֵךְ
בְּגֵיא צַלְמָוֶת,
לֹא־אִירָא רָע--
כִּי־אַתָּה עִמָּדִי;
שִׁבְטְךָ וּמִשְׁעַנְתֶּךָ,
הֵמָּה יְנַחֲמֻנִי.

לָמָּה, רָגְשׁוּ גוֹיִם;
וּלְאֻמִּים, יֶהְגּוּ־רִיק.
יִתְיַצְּבוּ, מַלְכֵי־אֶרֶץ--
וְרוֹזְנִים נוֹסְדוּ־יָחַד:
עַל־יְהוָה, וְעַל־מְשִׁיחוֹ.
נְנַתְּקָה, אֶת־מוֹסְרוֹתֵימוֹ;
וְנַשְׁלִיכָה מִמֶּנּוּ עֲבֹתֵימוֹ.
יוֹשֵׁב בַּשָּׁמַיִם
יִשְׂחָק: אֲדֹנָי,
יִלְעַג־לָמוֹ.

תַּעֲרֹךְ לְפָנַי, שֻׁלְחָן--
נֶגֶד צֹרְרָי;
דִּשַּׁנְתָּ בַשֶּׁמֶן רֹאשִׁי,
כּוֹסִי רְוָיָה.

אַךְ, טוֹב וָחֶסֶד
יִרְדְּפוּנִי-- כָּל־יְמֵי חַיָּי;
וְשַׁבְתִּי בְּבֵית־יְהוָה,
לְאֹרֶךְ יָמִים.

"David" and sopranos (Psalm 23)
Adonai ro-i, lo eḥsar.
Bin'ot deshe yarbitseini,
Al mei m'nuḥot y'nahaleini,
Naf'shi y'shovev,
Yan'ḥeini b'ma'aglei tsedek,
L'ma'an sh'mo.
(sopranos)
Gam ki eilech
B'gei tsalmavet,
Lo ira ra,
Ki Atah imadi.
Shiv't'cha umishan'techa
Hemah y'naḥamuni.
(Tenors and basses (Psalm 2, vs. 1-4))
Lamah rag'shu goyim
Ul'umim yeh'gu rik?
Yit'yats'vu malchei erets,
V'roznim nos'du yaḥad
Al Adonai v'al m'shiḥo.
N'natkah et mos'roteimo,
V'nashlichah mimenu avoteimo.
Yoshev bashamayim
Yis'ḥak, Adonai
Yil'ag lamo!
(sopranos (Psalm 23))
Ta'aroch l'fanai shulḥan
Neged tsor'rai
Dishanta vashemen roshi
Cosi r'vayah.
"David"
Ach tov vaḥesed
Yird'funi kol y'mei ḥayai
V'shav'ti b'veit Adonai
L'orech yamim.

The Lord is my shepherd, I shall not want.
He maketh me to lie down in green pastures,
He leadeth me beside the still waters,
He restoreth my soul,
He leadeth me in the paths of righteousness,
For His name's sake.

Yea, though I walk
Through the valley of the shadow of death,
I will fear no evil,
For Thou art with me.
Thy rod and Thy staff
They comfort me.

Why do the nations rage,
And the people imagine a vain thing?
The kings of the earth set themselves,
And the rulers take counsel together
Against the Lord and against His anointed.
Saying, let us break their bands asunder,
And cast away their cords from us.
He that sitteth in the heavens
Shall laugh, and the Lord
Shall have them in derision!

Thou preparest a table before me
In the presence of my enemies,
Thou anointest my head with oil,
My cup runneth over.

Surely goodness and mercy
Shall follow me all the days of my life,
And I will dwell in the house of the Lord
Forever.

The second movement begins with the Psalm of David set in a conventional meter (3/4) with a tranquil melody, sung by the boy treble (or countertenor), and repeated by the soprano voices in the chorus. This is abruptly interrupted by the orchestra and the low, rumbling sounds (again word painting) of the men's voices singing Psalm 2 (also notably featured in Handel's Messiah). This is gradually overpowered by the soprano voices (with the direction—at measure 102 in the vocal score only—"blissfully unaware of threat") with David serenely reaffirming the second portion of Psalm 23. However, the last measures of the movement contain notes which recall the interrupting section, symbolizing mankind's unending struggle with conflict and faith.

The music for the beginning of the second movement is taken from sketches from Bernstein's unfinished The Skin of Our Teeth. The men's theme was adapted from material cut from West Side Story.

=== Third movement ===
Psalm 131

יְהוָה,
לֹא־גָבַהּ לִבִּי--
וְלֹא־רָמוּ עֵינַי;
וְלֹא־הִלַּכְתִּי,
בִּגְדֹלוֹת וּבְנִפְלָאוֹת
מִמֶּנִּי.
אִם־לֹא שִׁוִּיתִי,
וְדוֹמַמְתִּי--
נַפְשִׁי: כְּגָמֻל, עֲלֵי אִמּוֹ;
כַּגָּמֻל עָלַי נַפְשִׁי.
יַחֵל יִשְׂרָאֵל, אֶל־יְהוָה--
מֵעַתָּה, וְעַד־עוֹלָם.

Adonai, Adonai,
Lo gavah libi,
V'lo ramu einai,
V'lo hilachti
Big'dolot uv'niflaot
Mimeni.
Im lo shiviti
V'domam'ti,
Naf'shi k'gamul alei imo,
Kagamul alai naf'shi.
Yaḥel Yis'rael el Adonai
Me'atah v'ad olam.

Lord, Lord,
My heart is not haughty,
Nor mine eyes lofty,
Neither do I exercise myself
In great matters or in things
Too wonderful for me to understand.
Surely I have calmed
And quieted myself,
As a child that is weaned of his mother,
My soul is even as a weaned child.
Let Israel hope in the Lord
From henceforth and forever.

The third movement begins with a conflicted and busy instrumental prelude which recapitulates the chords and melody from the introduction, then suddenly it breaks into the gentle chorale set in a rolling 10/4 meter (subdivided as 2+3+2+3/4) which recalls desert palms swaying in the breeze.

=== Finale ===
Psalm 133, vs. 1

הִנֵּה מַה־טּוֹב,
וּמַה־נָּעִים--
שֶׁבֶת אַחִים
גַּם־יָחַד.

Hineh mah tov,
Umah na'im,
Shevet aḥim
Gam yaḥad

Behold how good,
And how pleasant it is,
For brethren to dwell
Together in unity.

The finale comes in from the third movement without interruption. The principal motifs from the introduction return here to unify the work and create a sense of returning to the beginning, but here the motifs are sung pianississimo and greatly extended in length. Particularly luminous harmonies eventually give way to a unison note on the last syllable of the text—another example of word painting, since the final Hebrew word, Yaḥad, means "together" or, more precisely, "as one". This same note is that on which the choir then sings the Amen, while one muted trumpet plays the opening motif one last time and the orchestra, too, ends on a unison G, with a tiny hint of a Picardy third.

== Scoring ==
In the score, Bernstein notes that the soprano and alto parts were written "with boys' voices in mind," and that it is "possible but not preferable" to use women's voices instead. However, he states that the male alto solo "must not be sung by a woman," but either by a boy or a countertenor. This was to reinforce the liturgical meaning of the passage sung, perhaps to suggest that Psalm 23, a "Psalm of David" from the Hebrew Bible, was to be heard as if sung by the boy David himself.

The orchestra consists of 3 trumpets in B♭, 3 trombones, timpani, a five-person percussion section, 2 harps, and strings. A reduction written by the composer pared down the orchestral performance forces to organ, one harp, and percussion.

== Music ==
The Psalms, and the first movement in particular, are noted for the difficulty they pose for the performers. For example, the opening is difficult for the tenors, owing to the unusually wide vocal range, rhythmic complexity, and the consistent presence of strange and difficult-to-maintain parallel 7ths between the tenor and bass parts. The interval of a seventh figures prominently throughout the piece because of its numerological importance in the Judeo-Christian tradition; the first movement is written in the unusual 7/4 meter.

Chichester Psalms significantly features the harp; the full orchestral version requires two intricate harp parts. Bernstein completed the harp parts before composing the accompanying orchestral and choral parts, thus granting the harpists a pivotal role in realizing the music. In rehearsals, he is noted to have requested that the harpists play through the piece before the rest of the orchestra to emphasize the importance of the harps' role.

== Publication and recordings ==
Chichester Psalms was published in 1965 by Boosey & Hawkes.

Chichester Psalms was recorded in the 1970s by the Choir of King's College, Cambridge, in the version with only three instrumentalists. It was conducted by Philip Ledger with James Bowman as the countertenor soloist. The instrumentalists were David Corkhill (percussion), Osian Ellis (harp) and James Lancelot (organ). When Richard Hickox recorded the work in the 1980s, the composer gave his approval for the solo part to be sung by Aled Jones, then a treble. A 2003 recording was performed by Thomas Kelly (treble) and the Bournemouth Symphony Chorus and Orchestra, conducted by Marin Alsop. In 2018 another recording by the Choir of King's College, Cambridge was released, this time conducted by Stephen Cleobury with George Hill as the treble soloist.
