= Aus der Tiefen rufe ich, Herr, zu dir =

"Aus der Tiefen rufe ich, Herr, zu dir" (From the deep I cry to thee, O Lord) is a German hymn with a text by Georg Christoph Schwämlein. The opening lines of the hymn stay close to those of Psalm 130, while most stanzas of the hymn are written from a Christian perspective. It was first published, with its own hymn tune (Zahn No. 1217), in the Nürnberg hymnal of 1676. Gottfried Vopelius published it with a new hymn tune (Zahn No. 1218) in the 1682 Neu Leipziger Gesangbuch, p. 936. From 1699 to 1738 the hymn was published with four more new melodies (Zahn Nos. 1219–1222).

In the Gotha hymnal, the hymn was adopted with "Ach was ist doch unser Leben" as singing tune. The central chorale movement of Gottfried Heinrich Stölzel's 1744 cantata for Rogate Sunday, Aus der Tiefen rufe ich, H. 419, has the first stanza of the hymn as text, set to the tune indicated by the Gotha hymnal. BWV 744 is a chorale prelude by Johann Sebastian Bach, or by his son Carl Philipp Emanuel, on the Zahn 1217 hymn tune. Johann Friedrich Fasch used the fifth stanza of Schwämmlein's hymn in a cantate for Jubilate Sunday, Ach Gott, wie manches Herzeleid, FR 632.
