= Six Motets, Op. 82 (Kiel) =

Musical composition by Friedrich Kiel

Six Motets
- by Friedrich Kiel
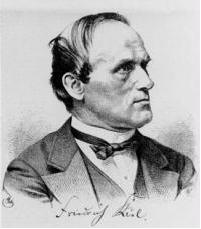
- The composer
- Full title: Sechs Motetten für gemischten Chor a cappella
- Opus: 82
- Text: Verses from Psalms 23, 133, 84, 130, 126 and 13
- Language: German
- Composed: 1883
- Published: 1883
- Scoring: Mixed choir

Six Motets, Op. 82, are six motets for choir a cappella by Friedrich Kiel. He set selected psalm verses in German. The motets were published in 1883 by Bote & Bock, dedicated to H. A. Köstlin, as Sechs Motetten für gemischten Chor a cappella.

== History ==
Kiel composed the six motets for choir a cappella in 1883, setting psalm verses in German. In Berlin, he had been called by Joseph Joachim to teach composition at the new Königlich Akademische Hochschule für ausübende Tonkunst (Royal academic university for music in practice) in 1869, and was appointed director of the composition class and member of the board of five directors in 1882. In a contemporary book The History of Music (Illustrierte Musikgeschichte) by Emil Naumann, he was hailed as excelling in sacred music, especially in counterpoint. In the winter of 1880/81, Kiel suffered from a life-threatening disease which kept him away from work for weeks.

Kiel dedicated the motets to his friend Heinrich Adolf Köstlin, a Protestant minister whose mother, Josefine Lang, was a composer of songs. The motets were published in 1883 by Bote & Bock, as Sechs Motetten für gemischten Chor a cappella. They were also published by Schott Music. Two of the motets were published by Carus-Verlag in 2004.

== Structure and text ==
In the motets, Kiel set selected verses from Psalms. The works were first printed in two parts (Hefte), numbers 1 to 4 in Heft 1, the other two in Heft 2.

The following table shows the incipit, the English translation according to the King James Version (KJV), the psalm from which verses were selected, the verses in the Bible which Kiel used, and the verses if different in the KJV.

Motets
Incipit	Translation for mass	Psalm	Verses	Verses in KJV
Und ob ich schon wanderte im finstern Thal	Yea, though I walk through the valley of the shadow of death	Psalm 23	4	
Siehe, wie fein und lieblich ist es	Behold, how good and how pleasant it is	Psalm 133	1, 3	
Wie lieblich sind deine Wohnungen	How amiable are thy tabernacles	Psalm 84	2, 3	1, 2
Aus der Tiefe rufe ich	Out of the depths have I cried	Psalm 130	1–4	
Die mit Tränen säen	They that sow in tears	Psalm 126	5–6 or 5	
Herr, wie lange willst du meiner so gar vergessen	How long wilt thou forget me, O LORD?	Psalm 13	2–4	1–3

The first motet is a setting of verse 4 from Psalm 23 (The Lord is my Shepherd): "Und ob ich schon wanderte im finstern Thal" (Yea, though I walk through the valley of the shadow of death). The motet is in F major, common time, and marked Andante con moto. The second motet sets the first and last verses from Psalm 133, "Siehe, wie fein und lieblich ist es" (Behold, how good and how pleasant it is [for brethren to dwell together in unity]). The motet is in D major, common time, and marked Moderato. For the third motet, Kiel chose the beginning of Psalm 84, "Wie lieblich sind deine Wohnungen" (How amiable are thy tabernacles), which Johannes Brahms had used for the central movement of Ein deutsches Requiem. Kiel set it in G major, 6/4-time, and marked Allegretto con moto. In the fourth motet, Kiel set the beginning of Psalm 130, "Aus der Tiefe rufe ich" (Out of the depths have I cried), in C minor, common time, and marked Moderato.

For the fifth motet, Kiel chose two verses from Psalm 126, "Die mit Tränen säen" (They that sow in tears), words that Brahms had set in the first movement of his Requiem. The motet is in A♭ major, 6/4-time, and marked Larghetto con moto. The text of the sixth motet is taken from Psalm 13, "Herr, wie lange willst du meiner so gar vergessen" (How long wilt thou forget me, O LORD?). The first part is in B♭ minor, the second part, "Schau doch und erhöre mich" (Consider and hear me), in D♭ major. In the first and last of the motets, the soprano is divided.

== Recording ==
The motets were recorded in 1991 by the choir of Berlin's St. Hedwig's Cathedral, conducted by Roland Bader, together with Kiel's Der Stern von Bethlehem, Op. 83.
