= The Septuagint version of the Old Testament (Brenton) =

1844 English translation from the Greek

- Full name: The Septuagint version of the Old Testament
- OT published: 1844
- Online as: The Septuagint version of the Old Testament (Brenton) at Wikisource
- Authorship: Sir Lancelot Charles Lee Brenton
- Textual basis: OT: Codex Vaticanus
- Version revision: 1851, 1870
- Publisher: Samuel Bagster & Sons
- Copyright: Public domain
- Genesis 1:1–3 In the beginning God made the heaven and the earth. But the earth was unsightly and unfurnished, and darkness was over the deep, and the Spirit of God moved over the water. And God said, Let there be light, and there was light.

The Septuagint version of the Old Testament is a translation of the Septuagint to English by Sir Lancelot Charles Lee Brenton, originally published by Samuel Bagster & Sons, London, in 1844.

It was originally published without the Apocrypha, but from the 1851 edition, these texts were included. By 1870, a diglot edition with parallel Greek text existed; another one appeared in 1884. In the 20th century, it was reprinted by Zondervan, among others.

Codex Vaticanus is used as the primary source. Brenton's had been the most widely used translation until the publication of New English Translation of the Septuagint in 2007.
