= Lancelot Charles Lee Brenton =

British translator

Sir Lancelot Charles Lee Brenton, 2nd Baronet (16 February 1807 – 13 June 1862) was a British nobleman who translated the Septuagint version of the Bible into English.

== Life ==
Lancelot Brenton was the second of four children of Sir Jahleel Brenton, 1st Baronet, a Vice Admiral in the British Royal Navy who was made a baronet for services to the Crown. It was this title that Lancelot Brenton inherited (his older brother John Jervis Brenton having died in 1817). Lancelot however didn't inherit his father's acceptance of war; when he re-edited his father's biography he made it clear that he was a pacifist.

Brenton matriculated at Oriel College, Oxford in 1824, graduating B.A. in 1828. He was ordained by the Church of England in 1830. By December 1831, he had left the established Church to found an independent chapel in Bath with a friend, William Morshead. He had met John Nelson Darby at Oxford in 1830. By 1835, this chapel was associated with the Plymouth Brethren and by 1837 Brenton was contributing to The Christian Witness, an early Brethren journal, and appears to have cemented his relationship with the emerging Brethren movement.

On the death of his father in 1844, Brenton became the second baronet. He moved to the Isle of Wight from Bath in 1849 where, although married, he died childless, the second and last Baronet of his line.

== Works ==
Brenton's translation of the Septuagint was the second English translation available. It was first released in 1844 and has gone through several reprints and formats in the over a century and a half since.

In an autobiographical piece, Brenton discussed his pacifist views. Despite a marked naval background, he put it down to his father's evangelical religious attitude.

== Notes ==
Baronetage of the United Kingdom
Preceded by Jahleel Brenton	Baronet (of London); 1844–1862	Extinct
