= History of the Captivity in Babylon =

Apocryphal pseudepigraphical text of the Old Testament

The History of the Captivity in Babylon is a pseudepigraphical text of the Old Testament that supposedly provides omitted details concerning the prophet Jeremiah. It is preserved in Coptic, Arabic, and Garshuni manuscripts. It was most likely originally written in Greek sometime between 70 and 132 CE by a Jewish author and then subsequently reworked into a second, Christian edition in the form of 4 Baruch. It is no. 227 in the Clavis apocryphorum Veteris Testamenti, where it is referred to as Apocryphon Jeremiae de captivitate Babylonis. However, the simple form Apocryphon of Jeremiah, which is sometimes employed, should be avoided as the latter is used to describe fragments among the Dead Sea Scrolls.

== Sources ==
With the exception of Charlesworth, most scholars understand the History of the Captivity in Babylon to exist in two related versions.

=== Arabic version ===
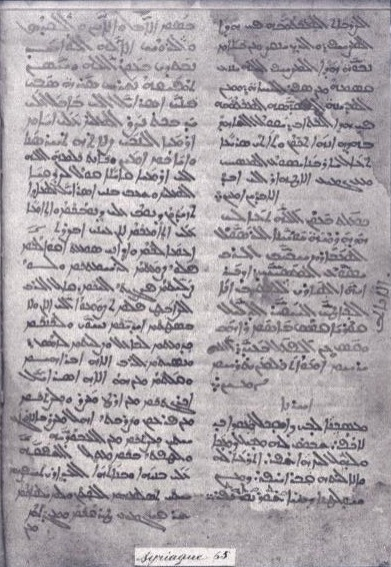
The beginning of the work in Paris BN Syr. 65 (Garshuni).

The first version to come to the attention of Western scholars (1888) is preserved in Arabic and Garshuni manuscripts. The French scholar Émile Amélineau translated an Arabic copy (British Museum Or. 3599) in his collection of Tales and Novels of Christian Egypt. In his brief introductory comments, Amélineau argued that certain expressions in the tale (e.g. "the whole earth" [la terre entière]) offered "convincing evidence that this story has been composed in Egypt" in Coptic. However, this view was challenged early on by Émile Galtier, who quipped, "one thing is certain—the primitive core of the account is neither Coptic, nor popular." In 1910, two more Frenchmen, Lucien Leroy and Pierre Dib, translated a Garshuni manuscript in the Bibliothèque nationale de France in Paris (Syr. 65). Finally, in 1927, Alphonse Mingana produced an English translation of the aforementioned Paris BN Syr. 65 along with another Garshuni manuscript (Syr. 240) that Mingana had recently acquired in Kurdistan. He thought that Syr. 65, "which is now in Garshuni was transcribed from a MS. written in Arabic characters and executed in Egypt. The same, however, could not be said of Syr. 240." This observation, along with the fact that the two manuscripts preserve different recensions of the story, led Mingana to conclude that the surviving witnesses "may provisionally be divided into an Egyptian recension and a Syrian, Palestinian, or Mesopotamian recension."

In recent times, René-Georges Coquin has confirmed Mingana's notion of two principal recensions. He has examined additional manuscripts and proposed the following classification:

1. Syrian. These are principally the manuscripts written in Garshuni: A) three Garshuni manuscripts in the Bibliothèque nationale de France: Syr. 65, Syr. 273, and Syr. 276; B) three Garshuni manuscripts in the Mingana collection, University of Birmingham: Syr. 240, Syr. 369, and Syr. 500 and Christian-Arabic 20 (28). To the latter are to be added the Arabic manuscript British Museum Or. 3599 and American University of Beirut 280, no. 26, 6. The Syrian version is characterized especially by the replacement of Astarte by Zeus in the text, a modification that Coquin sees as most likely of Palestinian origin.

2. Egyptian. These are principally the manuscripts written in Arabic characters and are also classified in two groups: A) Cambridge University Library, Syr. Add. 2886 (written in Garshuni and incomplete), Trinity College Library, Dublin 1531, 9, and the Bibliothèque nationale et universitaire, Strasbourg, Or. 4180 (Ar. 33); B) about twenty manuscripts in the Coptic Museum in Cairo.

Coquin argues that a special place in this categorization should be made for Paris BN Syr. 238. This version is written in Arabic characters for the first two thirds and then in Syriac characters for the final third. In addition to providing an older copy (dated to 1474 CE), it offers a redaction of the work much closer to the Coptic form. His examination of the manuscript revealed that "many readings are in conformity with the Coptic and in opposition to the Garshuni or Arabic manuscripts." A century earlier, Zotenberg had noted in his catalog: "This copy differs by a great number of variants of words, and by whole passages, with the exemplar contained in MS no. 65." Though noting this manuscript and the description in Zotenberg, Mingana decided to pay "no attention" to it, apparently not aware of its special nature. "From this examination," Coquin concludes, "it appears now possible to specify that the archetype was Egyptian and that from it two recensions derive, one Egyptian, naturally more faithful to the original, and the other Syrian, having been subject to Palestinian and Mesopotamian influences."

=== Coptic version ===
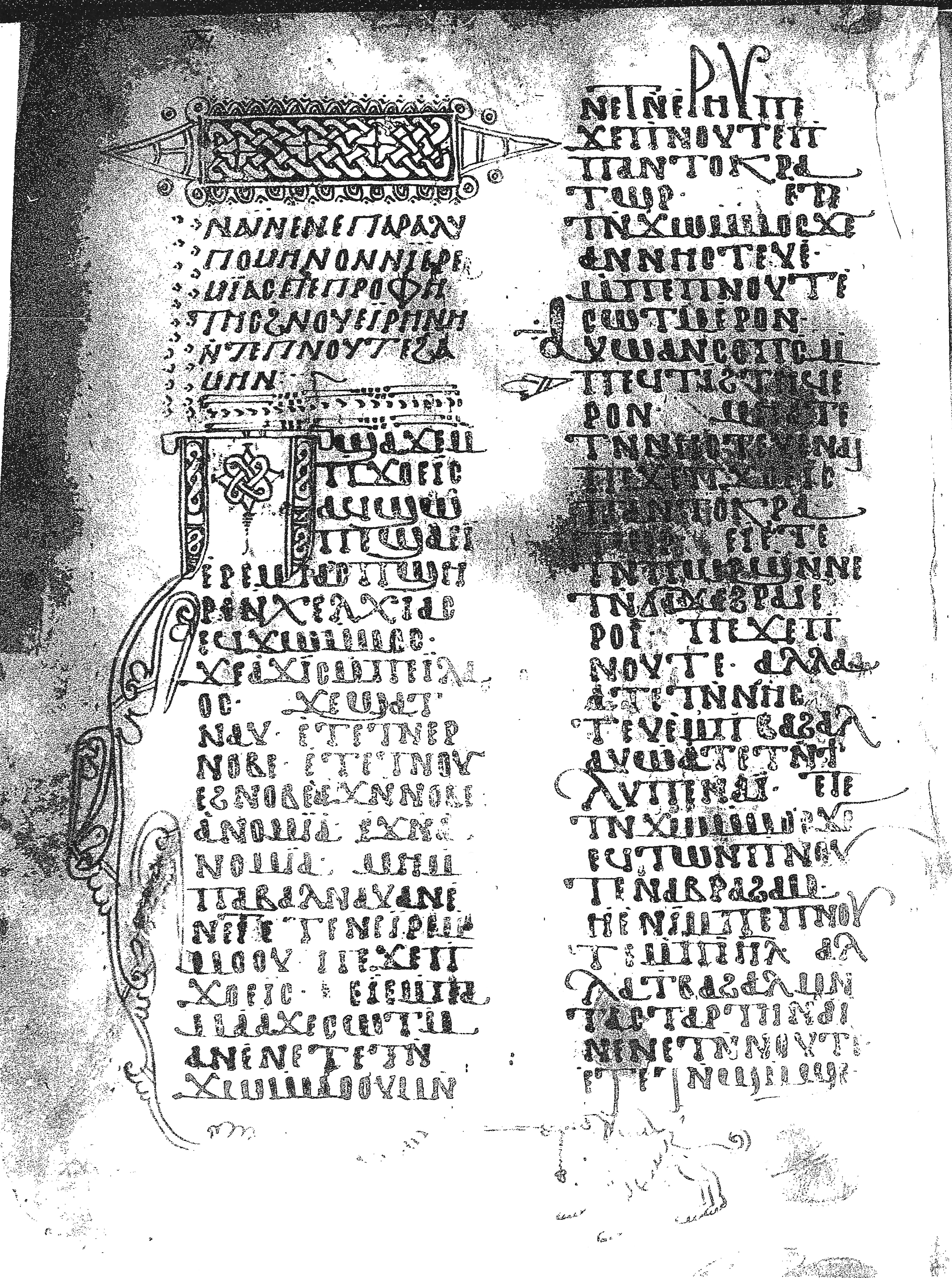
The beginning of the work in P. Morgan M. 578 (Sahidic).

The Coptic version has usually been referred to in the scholarly literature as the Coptic Jeremiah Apocryphon, due to the editio princeps published by Karl Heinz Kuhn in 1970. The first evidence of a Coptic version came from a manuscript folio (Vienna K. 9846) that was published in 1909 along with a German translation by Carl Wessely. That same year Walter E. Crum pointed out its relationship to the Arabic version translated by Amélineau and also revealed that another single folio, which directly preceded it in the original manuscript, may be found in Paris BN copte 132^{1}, 16. The next folio, 132^{1}, 17, also contains a portion of the work, though there is some doubt if it originally came from the same manuscript. The next year a Coptic manuscript was found (Pierpont Morgan Library M. 578) that contained the complete text, though the existence of this version was not widely known until 1937. It was Crum who again called attention to the manuscript and further announced that remnants of a Fayyumic version were preserved on papyrus in British Museum Department of Egyptian and Assyrian Antiquities 10578. The latter manuscript is important as it is dated in the seventh century and thus serves as a terminus ante quem for the work. Finally Kuhn in 1970 produced a critical edition and English translation of P. Morgan M. 578, including in appendices the other Coptic witnesses. In 1980 Jean-Marc Rosenstiehl submitted a dissertation to the University of Strasbourg on the Coptic version, with French translation and notes, which regrettably still remains unpublished. The title of the Coptic version is, "Supplements to the Prophet Jeremiah" (Paralipomena Jeremiae prophetae), the same as the Greek work by that name, also known as 4 Baruch.

== Origins ==
"Of the extant versions of the work," writes Kuhn, "the Coptic is, no doubt, the primary." As noted above, the first translator of the work into a modern language Amélineau thought the work originally was composed in Coptic, and Mingana at several points in his translation calls attention to a likely Coptic predecessor. Yet, it is Coquin who has conducted the most thorough investigation of the dependence of the Arabic version on the Coptic. Though virtually all the surviving manuscripts are Arabic, none is earlier than the fifteenth century. The oldest, dated manuscript from those witnesses, Paris BN Syr. 238 (dated 1474 CE), which was mentioned above, shows a clear debt to a Coptic version. Among other things, it twice reproduces, rather awkwardly, the number 40 using the cursive Coptic character rather than the word, clearly indicating there was no understanding of the Egyptian model. Amélineau had already observed that in BM Or. 3599 the Arabic translator transposes well-known topography of Alexandria to that of ancient Jerusalem; thus, instead of "Benjamin's Gate," one finds "the Gate of the Sun." Furthermore, many Garshuni manuscripts refer to the Egyptian month Parmoute (= Barmoudah) and by doing this, as Coquin observes, they "betray their source, if not immediate, at least that of their archetype, because, one would not read such a name of month in a text written by a Syriac-speaking Christian." There is also a strange scribal error in Paris BN Syr. 65, which yields the curious reading that "Zedekiah the King relapsed in sin before the Lord; he entered the house of the Lord and took out the two marble columns that illuminate without a torch and put them in the pool that was before the idols of Baal and Zeus." Following which, "he set for himself a table near the pool of Baal and Zeus." The word "pool" (birka) here is incongruous and the result of a scribe not understanding the word birba, a rare word borrowed from Coptic in Christian Arabic of Egypt (= Π (Coptic article masculine) + Ρ Π Ε (= temple)), which a non-Egyptian Arabic-speaking person could not understand, and thus slightly altered, leaving a rather odd narrative. Despite the detailed work by Coquin, Kuhn, and Piovanelli, it is the late and inaccurate Arabic version that is still used by many researchers.

Though we possess no manuscript evidence, the Coptic version most likely derives from a Greek original. Harris and Mingana both conjectured there was a Greek original. Kuhn thought that "the wide range of Greek loan-words used in the Coptic text," including some rather rare ones, was an argument for a Greek original. He concluded that "if the work in its original form was Jewish rather than Christian, it is very unlikely that it was at the initial stage written in Coptic. It may, therefore, be concluded, at least tentatively, that the Coptic version of the Jeremiah Apocryphon is a translation or recension of a Greek work." However, it is Coquin, who once again, has conducted the most thorough investigation of the issue, and he is of the opinion that the Coptic version is a translation of an earlier Greek original.

In its present form the work is a Christian production. Harris noted in his introduction that there are "passages which look like evangelical reflections, but at the same time there are other passages which require the Talmud, or at least the folk-lore traditions embedded in the Talmud, for their elucidation." Nevertheless, he concluded that there has not been "direct Jewish influence" on the work. A very different conclusion was reached by the Talmudic scholar Arthur Marmorstein. He collected rabbinical material relevant to the study of the work and determined that in its original form the work was in fact Jewish. His analysis has been generally accepted by later scholars. "It is, therefore, very probable," writes Kuhn, "that the work originated in Jewish circles and then was adopted, after some Christian redactorial activity, by the church." More recent work by Pierluigi Piovanelli has argued that the work is in fact an authentic Second Temple Jewish pseudepigraphon, though it is preserved in Christian medieval manuscripts. He writes: "It should be stressed that the text bears almost no trace of Christian influence, the only exception being a manifestly secondary interpolation inserted into the middle of Jeremiah's address to the cornerstone of the Temple (ch. 28). Throughout the rest of the story, neither Jeremiah nor any other character makes any Christological prophetic statements."

As for the dating of the original, it has already been noted that the earliest fragment of the Coptic version goes back to the seventh century. Thus, as Kuhn reasons, "If the work is dependent on Paralipomena Ieremiae which scholars assign to the 2nd century, the Jeremiah Apocryphon must be dated between the 2nd and 7th centuries." Marmorstein had suggested the 3rd or 4th centuries and was followed by Wolff and Denis, with Schützinger opting for the 3rd century and Gutmann going as early as the 2nd century. Research in recent years has called for an even earlier date. In his still unpublished dissertation, Rosenstiehl says the author's ideology fits perfectly into the historical perspective of Judaism in the first century BCE, and, in particular, the religious problem caused by the desecration of the Temple by Pompey in 63 BCE. He suggests a date between the last decades of the first century BCE and the reign of Agrippa I/II (37-50 CE). Piovanelli argues for the period between the two Jewish wars, which is 70/74 to 132 CE.

== Content ==
The work begins in a biblical fashion: "The word of the Lord came to Jeremiah the son of Hilkiah, saying, Say to this people: How long will ye sin, adding sin upon sin, lawlessness upon lawlessness? ..." Jeremiah is charged with delivering a condemnation of the Israelites for turning to other gods and instructed to deliver it to King Zedekiah (1-4) and after a confrontation with the false prophet Hananiah, is thrown into prison (5). The Ethiopian Ebedmelech obtains Jeremiah's release from prison (6). Jeremiah is again commanded to deliver God's message to the king, then arrested and imprisoned (7-11). Ebedmelech intervenes a second time to free Jeremiah from a pit of mire (12). The king and people continue in sin and a punishment is chosen (12-15). The angel Michael visits Nebuchadnezzar and convinces him to march on Israel, which he eventually does (16-21). Ebedmelech falls asleep in the garden of Agrippa (22). The Israelites, along with the king, are taken prisoner and suffer punishments (23-26). Jeremiah is told that the captivity will be spared if he can find one honest man, but he fails (27-28). The people are taken into captivity and after forty years Zedekiah dies (29-31). Nebuchadnezzar dies and is replaced by Cyrus, while Ezra emerges as a leader among the Israelites (32-35). After divine intervention, the people are freed from their captivity (36-37). Ebedmelech awakens from his seventy-year slumber to see Jeremiah's return to Jerusalem (38-40). Jeremiah enters the temple and a service of thanksgiving is performed (41).

The work relies primarily on the Bible for its subject matter. For instance, the first twelve chapters are an elaboration of Jeremiah 32, 37, 38. However, in the expansion it is not always clear whether the author is drawing upon extra-biblical material or his own imagination. Piovanelli describes the work as "a narrative midrash of Psalm 126 ('When the Lord brought back the captive ones of Zion, we were like those who dream ...')." As for other possible sources the author of the work may have employed, Harris argues for the influence of the Arabic Diatessaron of Tatian; Marmorstein points out numerous rabbinic parallels; and Gutmann and Kuhn mention 2 Maccabees 2.

The work is clearly related to 4 Baruch, to the extent that, as has been mentioned, the Coptic version shares the same title, Supplements to the Prophet Jeremiah. Earlier scholars have conjectured that the author of 4 Baruch used this work as one of his sources, though Jens Herzer cautions, "4 Baruch was not a literary model for the Apocryphon of Jeremiah but a known tradition freely used, shaped, and combined with others." However, it is difficult to explain why someone possessing a copy of 4 Baruch would have reworked it into the much longer History of the Captivity. It has now been powerfully argued by Piovanelli that this work is the first Jewish edition of Supplements, and that 4 Baruch is a second edition, executed by a Christian hand: "The amazing part is that the Apocryphon actually resembles the first, Jewish edition that the specialists of source criticism had imagined in the background of the Paraleipomena. As but one example, when Jeremiah commits the keys of the Temple to the tower for safe keeping (ch. 29), the time of restoration is fixed as "until the people return from captivity." However, in the parallel narrative in 4 Baruch 3:7-8, when Jeremiah commits the holy vessels to the earth, the time has become "until the gathering of the beloved one." Not only is there an alteration to the time for restoration, now linking it to a messianic figure, but the keys (or vessels) are not actually restored in 4 Baruch, as they are in this work (ch. 41).

Undoubtedly, the greatest degree of correspondence between the two works may be observed in their shared narrative of the long sleep of Ebedmelech. The tale of an exceptionally long sleep is found in many cultures, with examples such as Epimenides of Crete, the Seven Sleepers of Ephesus, and Rip Van Winkle. However, the closest and most relevant parallel may be found in rabbinic literature. The Babylonian Talmud tractate Ta'anit 23a and Jerusalem Talmud tractate Ta'anit 3:9 both contain a very similar narrative concerning the wonder-worker Honi the Circle-Drawer (Honi ha-M'agel), who was supposed to have lived in the first half of the first century BCE. Piovanelli summarizes in tabular form the key elements of the narrative in 4 Baruch, Captivity, and the Talmuds and argues that there is "an almost perfect identity of scenery and subjects" between the narrative of the Captivity and the legend of the Jerusalem Talmud:

Character	Context	Sleep	Place	Meaning	Consequences
Ebedmelech, 4 Baruch	destruction of the 1st temple	66 years	in the shade of a tree	return from the exile of death	transition from sorrow to joy
Ebedmelech, Captivity	destruction of the 1st temple	70 years	under a rock	return from the exile in Babylon	transition from sorrow to joy
Honi, Jerusalem Talmud	destruction of the 1st temple	70 years	in a cave	return from the exile in Babylon	restoration of the previous situation
Honi, Babylonian Talmud	out of context	70 years	under a rock	no return	death

In both the Captivity and the Jerusalem Talmud, the hero escapes the destruction of Jerusalem and deportation by falling asleep under "a rocky overhang" or in a cave (a detail modified in 4 Baruch), his sleep has a duration of 70 years (not 66 years), and his awakening coincides with the return from exile and the rebuilding of the Temple. As Piovanelli observes: "It seems clear that the story of the History and the legend of the Jerusalem Talmud go back to a time when you could still expect a benevolent repetition of history and the rebuilding of a third temple in about 140 years." The priority of the version in 4 Baruch has previously been argued for on the basis of its attention to geography and its odd selection of 66 years for the duration of Ebedmelech's slumber. However, most of these analyses have relied on the later and more unreliable Arabic version. For example, Herzer writes that "the 'vineyard of Agrippa' becomes 'the garden of his master', probably because the connotations of the former were no longer comprehensible to the author of Apocryphon of Jeremiah." However, the Coptic version in fact reads "the garden of Agrippa." As for the change of the sleep period to 66 years, Piovanelli explains that this alteration was made "in order to better highlight the futility of such hopes, which had resulted in the defeat of Bar Kochba and the proclamation of the Edict of Hadrian in 136 (= 70 + 66)", which barred Jews from entering Jerusalem on pain of death. The change of the place of repose to the shade of a tree in 4 Baruch is unique among the ancient sleep narratives and reminiscent of the iconography of Jonah under the castor-oil plant (cf. Jonah 4:5-11) found on Christian sarcophagi after the fourth century CE. Finally, the change of a basket full of figs, grapes, and other fruit becomes solely figs in 4 Baruch, which are portrayed with "salvific symbolism." As Herzer explains, "Baruch understands the fresh figs from Abimelech's basket as a symbol of the reward of the pious, or the 'holy ones,' in the time of salvation, specifically the hope of resurrection." All these changes in 4 Baruch have a decidedly later and Christian tone.

Another parallel involves a miracle where the young Ezra carries water in his cloak, just as Jesus does in the Infancy Gospel of Thomas.

Captivity (Coptic)	Captivity (Arabic)	Infancy Gospel of Thomas (Greek)
The children of the Hebrews and the Chaldeans went to the river at eventide to draw water and sprinkle the school. While they were yet walking one with another on their way to the river, they filled their vessels with water, (and) the vessel that was in Ezra's hand broke. ... he went down to the water, filled his robe like a vessel with water, raised it upon his shoulder, (and) went with the children. And when he reached the school, he put his robe down full of water like a vessel, (and) he sprinkled the school. When he had finished sprinkling it, he took his robe which was dry (and) put it on.	And the children of the Hebrews and the children of the Chaldeans used to go every day and carry water on their shoulders for their teachers. When they went one day to carry water, the jar of Ezra fell down and broke. ... [he] went into the sea, and filled it with water as if it were a jar; then he placed it on his shoulder and walked with his fellow-students, and not a single drop fell from it. When he reached the scribes, he began to sprinkle the place with water from his mantle; then he put it on immediately, and it was as dry as before.	And when he was six years old, his mother sent him to draw water and bring it home, having given him a water-pot. And being thronged by the crowd, the water-pot was broken. But Jesus spreading out the garment with which he was clothed, filled it with water, and carried it to his mother. And when his mother saw the miracle which was done, she kissed him, and kept to herself the wonders which she saw him do.

"It may be asked how we know that the priority belongs to the Gospel of the Infancy," writes Harris, "May not Jesus' miracle have copied Ezra's, since both are apocryphal?" He goes on to argue that the reason for the priority of the Infancy Gospel of Thomas account is that it "is concerned with the proofs of the Divine Nature of Christ, especially of Christ as Creator, fulfilling his own statement that the Son does the same works as the Father." To that end, Harris sees it as a direct response to Proverbs 30, which speaks of "the Holy One":

Who has gone up to heaven and come down?
Whose hands have gathered up the wind?
Who has wrapped up the waters in a cloak?
Who has established all the ends of the earth?
What is his name, and what is the name of his son?
Surely you know!

— Proverbs 30:4 (NIV)

Thus, in Harris' analysis the passage "was supposed to contain a reference to the Son of God; and by the simple expedient of a miraculous carrying of water in a garment, the argument for Divine Sonship became irresistible." However, Kuhn is not persuaded by this analysis, "particularly if it is asserted that the work is of Christian origin. Would a Christian transfer a miracle, the performance of which was attributed to Jesus, to Ezra? And if the work is of Jewish origin, would a Jew read and use the apocryphal gospel? Is it not, after all, more likely that this miracle story had been in existence for some time and was associated freely with the names of famous men to enhance their status? Piovanelli argues that "there is nothing to suggest that they [the water miracles] were inspired by late antique Christian apocryphal texts. The opposite could even be more plausible."

Several scholars have discussed the way the author has looked to the Psalms for inspiration and material for the work. James Kugel discusses how the work twice alludes to Psalm 137 and how the modifications may be considered "an early form of biblical interpretation." There are actually two allusions, the first of which Kugel styles "Babylonians Blasphemously Demand Songs."

Psalm 137:1-4 (REB)	Captivity (Coptic)	Captivity (Arabic)
By the rivers of Babylon we sat down and wept as we remembered Zion. On the willow trees there we hung up our lyres, for there those who had carried us captive asked us to sing them a song, our captors called on us to be joyful: "Sing us one of the songs of Zion." How could we sing the Lord's song in a foreign land?	The children of Israel were hanging their harps on the willow trees, resting themselves until the time when they were to work. The Chaldeans said to them: Sing us one of the songs that ye sing in the house of God in Jerusalem. But they sighed, saying: How can we sing the song of our God in a strange land?	The Chaldeans used to go every day to the river with their harps, and guitars, and used to ask the Hebrews, saying: "Show us how you sing to your Lord and your God." And the Hebrews used to answer with weeping and sighing: "How can we sing the praise of the Lord in a strange land?"

As Kugel explains, the "resting themselves" in the earlier Coptic version is presumably an explanation of "we sat down" in the psalm—that is to say, "we sat down in order to rest." However, it is the second allusion a bit later in the work in what Kugel styles "Levites Ascend to Heaven," only the Levites that are charged with singing. Not only that, but "when they do so they immediately begin to ascend into heaven, a miraculous ascent that leads the onlookers to think that the return from exile has begun, as the palace walls and the very heavens resound with God's praise." The author is here trying to deal with the question, "How can we sing a song of the Lord and still remain in a foreign land?" and secondarily with the question of why the harps are "hung up," stressing the meaning of "above." In Kugel's determination, "the passage presents a rather different reading of Psalm 137, one unattested in our rabbinic sources and which may therefore represent a relatively ancient grappling with this psalm's wording." In a similar fashion, Rosenstiehl looks at chapter 29 of the work and sees therein a commentary on Psalm 133, which interprets the psalm in the light of the Jewish Day of Atonement, in particular evoking part of the ceremony of this holy day, one of the most important of post-exilic Israel. He concludes that this work "illustrates the technique of the commentary as it is practiced in the intertestamental period: the text, stripped from the Psalm is glossed, explained in the light of legendary data and amplified."
