= In convertendo Dominus =

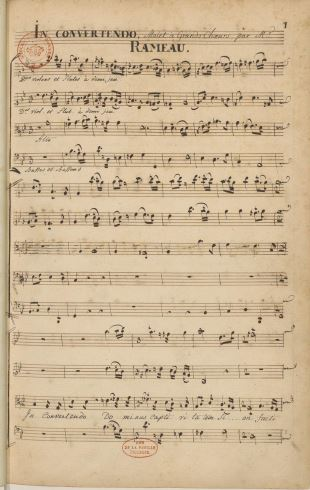
Title page of manuscript of Rameau's In convertendo. (1751 version)

In convertendo Dominus (When the Lord turned [the captivity of Zion]), sometimes referred to as In convertendo, is the Latin version of Psalm 126 (thus numbered in the King James Bible, number 125 in the Latin psalters). It has been set in full for a cappella choir by, amongst others, George de La Hèle (1547-1586) and Jean-Noël Marchand (1666-1710), by Dmitri Bortnyansky (1777), Marc-Antoine Charpentier H.169 (1670 ?), Michel-Richard Delalande S.25 (1684), Charles-Hubert Gervais (1723) and Jean-Philippe Rameau (In convertendo Dominus, c. 1710), by 16th century Scottish priest Patrick Douglas, as a motet for choir and orchestra and by Jules Van Nuffel for mixed choir and organ as his Op. 32 (1926); it has also been set in part (alternate verses only) for a cappella choir by Giovanni Bernardino Nanino. (For settings of the text in other languages, see here).

== Text ==
The Latin text is given below alongside the translation of the psalm in the King James Bible.

1 In convertendo Dominus captivitatem Sion, facti sumus sicut consolati.
2 Tunc repletum est gaudio os nostrum, et lingua nostra exsultatione. Tunc dicent inter gentes: Magnificavit Dominus facere cum eis.
3 Magnificavit Dominus facere nobiscum; facti sumus lætantes.
4 Converte, Domine, captivitatem nostram, sicut torrens in austro.
5 Qui seminant in lacrimis, in exsultatione metent.
6 Euntes ibant et flebant, mittentes semina sua. Venientes autem venient cum exsultatione, portantes manipulos suos.

1 When the Lord turned again the captivity of Zion, we were like them that dream.
2 Then was our mouth filled with laughter, and our tongue with singing: then said they among the heathen, The Lord hath done great things for them.
3 The Lord hath done great things for us; whereof we are glad.
4 Turn again our captivity, O Lord, as the streams in the south.
5 They that sow in tears shall reap in joy.
6 He that goeth forth and weepeth, bearing precious seed, shall doubtless come again with rejoicing, bringing his sheaves with him.
