= Apocryphon of Jeremiah =

Apocryphon of Jeremiah may refer to:

- Rest of the Words of Baruch
- History of the Captivity in Babylon
- Parts of Pseudo-Ezekiel
