= Yisroel Meir Gabbai =

- ישראל מאיר גבאי
- Born: December 11, 1959 (age 66); France
- Occupation: Founder
- Organization: Agudas Ohalei Tzadikim
- Known for: Restoring graves of Jewish leaders

Yisroel Meir Gabbai (Hebrew: ישראל מאיר גבאי) is a Breslover Hasid who travels the world to locate, repair and maintain Jewish cemeteries, kevarim (gravesites) and ohels of Torah notables and tzaddiks. He is the founder of Agudas Ohalei Tzadikim.

== Biography ==
Gabbai's father was a native of Morocco and his mother a descendant of German Jews; they married in France, where Gabbai was born, on December 11, 1959.

He along with his family later moved to Israel. In his youth, Gabbai attended Yeshivas Lucerne under Rav Yitzchok Dov Koppelman and went on to study in the Ponevezh Yeshiva in Bnei Brak and the Breslov Yeshiva in Jerusalem.

== Grave restoration ==
In 1980, Gabbai traveled to the Soviet Union for the first time to visit the grave of Rebbe Nachman of Breslov in Uman, Ukraine. Upon touring other cities, he was shocked by the degradation and ruin of Jewish holy sites in Russia. During the Soviet era, Jewish gravestones were often uprooted by vandals or by poor people who used the stones for heating and building. In large cities, the Soviets destroyed and paved over entire cemeteries to build sports complexes and other buildings. In 1989, after the fall of Communism, Gabbai began his work of identifying and restoring Jewish holy sites in the Former Soviet Union.

In Medzhybizh, Ukraine, burial place of the Baal Shem Tov, Gabbai was instrumental in refurbishing the Baal Shem Tov's grave and ohel, which also covers the graves of the Degel Machaneh Ephraim, the Apter Rav, and Rabbi Boruch of Medzhybizh. Gabbai also built a large synagogue near the Baal Shem Tov's burial place, a guest house named Holiness and a mikveh. In 2010 he completed the reconstruction of the synagogue of the Apter Rav in Medzhybizh, which was destroyed by fire.

Gabbay's group was criticized for its work at the Medzhybizh cemetery where, in order to build an ohel around the grave of the sage Baal Shem Tov, dozens of surrounding graves were destroyed with gravestones being relocated and reset.

According to his website, Gabbai is active in nearly every Jewish cemetery in Ukraine, renovating, fencing and marking cemeteries which have been paved over for buildings. He also established a permanent ner tamid at the graves of the Baal Shem Tov and Rebbe Nachman of Breslov.

In recent years, Gabbai expanded his activities to include grave restoration work in Syria, Yemen, Turkey and Israel.

Gabbai calls on many resources in his work. For example, in the restorations in Mezhibuz, he consulted with an elderly Jew living in Ashdod, Israel, who had hid in Mezhibuz as an 18-year-old refugee during World War II, and with a rabbi whose father, the former Rav of the town, had sketched a detailed map that identified important graves and Jewish landmarks. In his quest to identify the unmarked grave of Rashi, he consulted with a French-Jewish philosopher who was able to access academic archives to unearth an ancient map.

=== Alleged damage of Sataniv cemetery ===
Gabbai and his organization, Agudas Oholei Tzadikkim, have been criticized by Jewish Heritage Europe for their work at the ancient Jewish cemetery at Sataniv, Ukraine where hundreds of gravestones dating as far back as the 16th century were uprooted from the graves beneath them, moved to different parts of the cemetery, and set in concrete in rows disconnected from the graves they were marking. The gravestones were set in a concrete base, which preservationists Jay and Marla Raucher Osborn said "likely compromises the stone materials in a way which will accelerate their decay and failure."

Samuel D. Gruber, President of the International Survey of Jewish Monuments criticised the project saying: "Righting fallen gravestones in their proper places is permissible but uprooting stones and disassociating them from the very remains they commemorate is an affront, a violation of centuries-old practice and norms, and a desecration".

== Accomplishments ==
His accomplishments include:

- The identification of the grave of Rabbi Shalom Shabazi in Yemen
- The identification of the grave of Rabbi Refael Katzin, nineteenth-century chief rabbi of Aleppo, in Aleppo, Syria
- Renovation of the grave of Rabbi Naphtali Katz in Istanbul
- The purchase of part of the ancient cemetery in Shepetivka, Ukraine, and the identification and restoration of the grave and ohel of Rabbi Pinchas of Koretz, plus the construction of a nearby guest house
- Identification and restoration of the graves of Abba Hilkiah and Hanan ha-Nehba, both grandchildren of Honi HaM'agel, in northern Israel
- Placement of a plaque at the burial site of Rashi and other Rishonim, alerting visitors that an unmarked square in the city of Troyes, France is in fact part of an ancient Jewish cemetery

== Traveling abroad ==
While Gabbai is a resident of Israel, he also has a French passport which allows him to enter countries hostile to Israel, such as Syria. When he travels, however, he makes no secret of his mission and dresses in full Hasidic regalia, including flat-topped, wide-brim hat, hand-knitted yarmulke, short pants and Hasidic rekel (long coat), in addition to his full beard and payot.
