= Abraham Maskileison =

Jewish scholar, rabbi, and author

Abraham Maskileison (also spelled Maskileyson, Maskileison, Maskil le-Eisan, Maskil le-Eitan or Maskil le-Etan; Hebrew: אברהם משכיל לאיתן; b. 1788 – d. 1848) was a prominent Jewish scholar, rabbi and author active in Russia during the first half of the 19th century.

His designation and family name, Maskileison, derives from the Ashkenazi pronunciation pronunciation of the title of his book, Maskil le-Eitan, which itself is taken from Ps. 88:1.

== Biography ==
Abraham Maskileison was born in Radoshkovichy (Radashkovichi), then in the Vilna Governorate of the Russian Empire, in 1788 (תקמ"ח). His parents were Chaya and Rabbi Yehuda (Judah) Leib ben Abraham Jaffe (1723–1783). His father served as the av beit din (head of the rabbinical court) of Khotimsk in Mogilev. Maskileison was a great-grandson of Rabbi Israel ben Aaron Jaffe of Shklov (1640–1702), a notable Talmudic scholar and author of Or Yisrael. Abraham studied under his father.

Maskileison discharged his rabbinical duties in many cities, serving as av beit din in Novogrudok. Having no desire to use his cabalistic knowledge for gain, he devoted his whole life to study of the Torah and the Talmud. He lived in comparative poverty, being satisfied with only a small income. He eventually settled in Minsk, where he lived until his death in July 1848 (י"ח בתמוז תר"ח) at approximately 60 years of age.

== Works ==
Abraham Maskileison was a prolific author of rabbinical works, including novellae (חדושים, original interpretations or commentaries) on Talmudic tractates and Maimonides' Mishneh Torah. Many of his works were published posthumously.

His known works include:

- Maskil le-Eisan (Hebrew: משכיל לאיתן; Vilno/Shklov, 1818). This work contains novellae to the Talmudic tractates of the orders Moed and Kodoshim. It was printed with the approbations of notable scholars such as Saul Katzenellenbogen of Vilno and Manasseh Iliyer.
- Be'er Avraham (Hebrew: באר אברהם; Vilna, 1844). This work consists of novellae to the Talmudic tractate Berakhot and the order Moed. It was published by his son Aaron. In its introduction, Abraham outlined seven primary aims for the work, which included explaining difficult Talmudic passages identified by the Tosafists, expounding on passages of Rashi with which the Tosafists disagreed, and profoundly examining Maimonides' laws where commentators struggled to find sources.

Posthumously published works include:

- Nachal Eisan (Hebrew: נחל איתן) (Vilna, 1855). This work contains novellae on the first two parts of Maimonides' Yad ha-Ḥazaḳah (Mishneh Torah). It also includes novellae by his brother Moses Nisan, compiled when he was 16. The work was edited and published by his son Naphtali.
- Mitzpeh Eisan (Hebrew: מצפה איתן) (Zhitomir, 1858–64; Vilna, 1880–86). This work contains novellae and glosses to tractates of the Talmud. It was first published in the Zhitomir edition of the Talmud and later republished in the Vilna Talmud with additional material from the author's manuscript, titled Tosefet Merubbah.
- Yad Abraham (Hebrew: יד אברהם) (Vilna, 1888). This book contains novellae on Yoreh De'ah, a section of the Shulhan Arukh.
- Ahavas Eisan (Hebrew: אהבת איתן) (1883–84). This collection includes comments and novellae on Ein Yaakov.
- Yad Eisan (Hebrew: יד איתן) (1900). This work contains glosses and novellae on Maimonides' Mishneh Torah, assembled from various manuscripts and collected under this title in the Yad ha-Hazakah edition.

His notes on Sifre were also published in Solomon Luria's edition (1866).

== Family ==
Abraham Maskileison married Chana (Hanna) Dina, daughter of Aryeh Leib, a scholar and merchant. They had several sons, many of whom became scholars and contributed to Jewish literature and community life:

- Aaron Maskileison published his father's books, including Be'er Avraham. Some of Aaron's own thoughts on the Torah are printed at the end of his father's Be'er Avraham.
  - Aaron's son Abraham Isaac Maskileison (1840–1905) authored two handwritten books Zera Eisan and Neharot Eisan but the manuscripts were lost. Reuven Katz (1880–1963), the chief rabbi of Petah Tikvah, was his son-in-law through Abraham's daughter Rachel.
- Kalman Kalonymus (Klementyi) Maskileison, a merchant, assisted financially in the publication of his father's book Be'er Avraham. His son Nissan (Nikolai) became a tsar-appointed doctor in 1895.
- Yehuda Leib Maskileison served as a rabbi in the city of Plyeshchanitsy, Minsk region.
- Naphtali Maskileison (1829–1897). His main work is his rearranged and republished critical edition, with his own footnotes, of the Seder ha-Dorot (1877–82) of Rabbi Jehiel Heilprin (1660–1746).
- Moses Nisan Maskileison (1835–1878) was av beit din of the community of Shumyachi and author of the Ḥikkrei Halakhot (1875 Vilno).
