= Naphtali Maskileison =

Belarusian poet

- Born: 20 February 1829; Radashkovichy, Vilna Governorate, Russian Empire
- Died: 19 November 1897 (aged 68); Minsk, Minsk Governorate, Russian Empire
- Occupations: Author, book-dealer
- Writing career
- Language: Hebrew

Naphtali Maskileison (Hebrew: נַפְתָּלִי מַשְֹכִּיל לְאֵיתָן, romanized: Naftali Maskil le-Eitan; 20 February 1829, Radashkovichy – 19 November 1897, Minsk) was an Imperial Russian Hebrew Maskilic author and book-dealer.

== Biography ==
Naphtali Maskileison was born at Radashkovichy, near Minsk. His father, Hebrew scholar Abraham Maskileison, instructed him in Talmud. Study of the poetical works of Moshe Chaim Luzzatto and Naphtali Wessely awakened Maskileison's interest in contemporary Hebrew literature, then regarded with disfavor by the Orthodox circles in which he grew up. His first poetical production was the drama Esther, which was praised by the poet Avraham Dov Ber Lebensohn. During a period of forty years, he published poems and prose articles in various Hebrew periodicals, as well as Miktabim le-lammed, a collection of eighty-eight letters of varied content (Vilna, 1870). One of Maskileison's most valuable undertakings was his revised edition of Jehiel Heilprin's Seder ha-dorot (Warsaw, 1878–1882). He left many works in manuscript.
