= List of compositions by Friedrich Kiel =

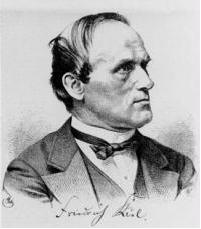
Friedrich Kiel

This is a list of compositions by Friedrich Kiel.

== Piano ==
=== Piano Solo ===
- 15 Kanons im Kammerstil, Op. 1
- Capriccietto, Op. 4
- Drei Romanzen, Op. 5
- Vier zweistimmige Fugen, Op. 10
- Große Polonaise, Op. 14
- Elf Melodien, Op. 15
- Variationen & Fuge, Op. 17
- Zehn Pianoforte-Stücke, Op. 18
- Zwei Impromptus, Op. 19
- Nachtklänge. Drei Pianofortstücke, Op. 21
- Zwei Capricen, Op. 26
- Tarantelle, Op. 27
- Suite (Sonate, Impromptu, Scherzo, Notturno), Op. 28
- Reiseerinnerungen (1. Heft), Op. 38
- Reiseerinnerungen (2. Heft), Op. 41
- Fantasie e-Moll, Op. 56
- Fantasie cis-Moll, Op. 58/1
- Drei Humoresken, Op. 59
- Fantasie in As-Dur, Op. 68
- Drei Klavierstücke, Op. 71
- Sechs Klavierstücke, Op. 72
- Sechs Impromptus, Op. 79
- Fünf Etüden
- Hongroise
- Zwei Nocturnes
- Albumblatt
- Bolero

=== Piano, four hands ===
- Zwei kleine Sonaten for Piano, four hands, Op. 6
- Variations on an Original Theme for Piano, four hands, Op. 23
- Four Humoresques for Piano, four hands, Op. 42
- Waltz for Piano, four hands, Op. 47
- Waltz for Piano, four hands, Op. 48

== Organ ==
- Three Fantasien

== Chamber music ==
=== Violin and Piano ===
- Sonata in D major for violin and piano, Op. 16
- Variationen über ein schwedisches Volkslied (Variations on a Swedish Folk Song), Op. 37
- Two Solopieces for violin and viano, Op. 70

=== Cello and Piano ===
- Reisebilder for Cello and Piano, Op. 11
- 3 Pieces for Cello and Piano, Op. 12
- Cello Sonata in A minor, Op. 52
- Little Suite for Cello and Piano, Op. 77
- Cello Sonata in D major

=== Piano Trio ===
- Piano Trio #1 in D major, Op. 3
- Piano Trio #2 in A major, Op. 22
- Piano Trio #3 in Es major, Op. 24
- Piano Trio #4 in cis minor, Op. 33
- Piano Trio #5 in G major, Op. 34
- Piano Trio #6 in A major, Op. 65/1
- Piano Trio #7 in G minor, Op. 65/2
- Piano Trio in G major

=== Piano Quartet ===
- Piano Quartet #1 in A minor, Op. 43
- Piano Quartet #2 in E major, Op. 44
- Piano Quartet #3 in G major, Op. 50

=== String Quartet ===
- String Quartet #1 in A minor, Op. 53/1
- String Quartet #2, Op. 53/2
- Waltz for String Quartet, Op. 73
- New Waltzes for String Quartet, Op. 78

=== Piano Quintet ===
- Piano Quintet #1 in A major, Op. 75
- Piano Quintet #2 in C minor, Op. 76

=== Other ===
- Viola Sonata in G minor, Op. 67
- Three Romances for viola and Piano, Op. 69
- Five Duos for Clarinet and Bassoon

== Orchestral ==
=== Piano and Orchestra ===
- Piano Concerto in B♭ major, Op. 30
- Fantasy for Piano and Orchestra

=== Other ===
- Overture for Orchestra, Op. 6

== Choral music ==
- Requiem in F minor, Op. 20
- Missa solemnis, Op. 40
- Requiem in A-flat major, Op. 80
- Six Motets, Op. 82
  - Und ob ich schon wanderte im finstern Thal (Psalm 23:4), Op. 82/1
  - Siehe, wie fein und lieblich ist es (Psalm 133:1, 3), Op. 82/2
  - Wie lieblich sind deine Wohnungen (Psalm 84:1, 2), Op. 82/3
  - Aus der Tiefe rufe ich, Herr, zu dir (Psalm 130), Op. 82/4
  - Die mit Tränen säen (Psalm 126:5), Op. 82/5
  - Herr, wie lange willst du meiner so gar vergessen (Psalm 13:2-4), Op. 82/6
- The Star of Bethlehem, Op. 83

== Lieder ==
- Liederkreis, Op. 31
