= In convertendo Dominus (Nuffel) =

Musical composition written by Jules Van Nuffel

- by Jules Van Nuffel
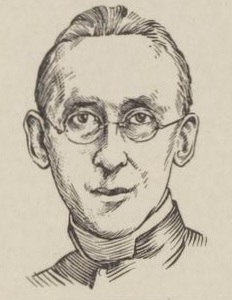
- Jules Van Nuffel
- Key: C♯ minor
- Opus: 32
- Genre: Chorale composition
- Text: In convertendo Dominus (Psalm 126)
- Language: Latin
- Composed: 1926
- Published: 1950
- Scoring: Mixed choir; organ

In convertendo Dominus (When the Lord turned [the captivity of Zion]), Op. 32, is the musical setting of In convertendo Dominus (Psalm 126 in Latin), written by Jules Van Nuffel in 1926 for a mixed choir and organ.

== History ==
Van Nuffel set many Latin texts to music, including ten psalms, for the liturgy and also concert at the Sint Rombouts Kathedraal in Mechelen, where he served as cantor, while Flor Peeters was organist. In the Latin Psalters the psalms are numbered differently. Psalm 125 there is Psalm 126 in the King James Bible. Van Nuffel set the psalm in 1926 for a mixed choir of four to eight parts and organ.

The psalm was published in 1950 by the Schwann Verlag (now part of Edition Peters), which published also seven other psalms of the composer. Two psalm compositions remained unfinished.

== Words and music ==
The composition of about 9 minutes in C♯ minor is in one movement, but Van Nuffel divided the psalm in sections of different mood and treatment and repeated the first verse in a magnified way.

(A) In convertendo Dominus (When the Lord turned − the captivity of Zion, verse 1), Adagio
(B) facti sumus sicut laetantes (whereof we are glad, verse 3b), Più vivo
(C) Qui seminant in lacrymas (They that sow in tears − shall reap in joy, verse 5), Calmato
(D) Venientes (They shall come − with rejoicing, verse 6b), Festivo
(A)′ In convertendo Dominus (repeat of verse 1), Maestoso

The words of C and D had also been composed by Brahms in A German Requiem: "Die mit Tränen säen, werden mit Freuden ernten". The psalm was written as a motet by composers such as Jean-Philippe Rameau (In convertendo Dominus) and Lorenzo Perosi.

In Van Nuffel's setting the organ plays an important independent role. It introduces the first theme, which is picked up by the voices on "In convertendo Dominus", reappearing slightly changed in B on "Converte, Domine" and again in unison of all voices, marked fff, at the beginning of A′. A solo section of the organ leads from a climax reached at the end of B to the tranquil beginning of C. In parts A and C the tenors begin singing, whereas the altos begin part B. The "carrying of the sheaves" is expressed by a divided choir, alternating in singing the same pattern higher and higher, choir 1 a four-part female choir, choir 2 the altos and a four-part men's choir, ending the section in eight parts.

A reviewer of a recording summarized in 1967:

Van Nuffel was a completely new name to me — a Belgian contemporary of Kodály who died in 1953 at the age of 70 — but I certainly want to hear more of his music: his setting … is in the traditional nineteenth-century idiom with a touch of modality suggesting certain passages in Puccini and early Vaughan Williams, but it is a powerful and moving piece, rising out of a brooding darkness to a big impassioned outburst, and dying away again.

== Recordings ==
- New Philharmonia Chorus: Choral works, New Philharmonia Chorus, conductor Wilhelm Pitz, His Master's Voice 1967
- Jules Van Nuffel Psalms — Tedeum, Choir of the Cathedral St. Rombouts, organist Peter Pieters, conductor Johan Van Bouwelen, RG 1991

== Sources ==
- The score
- Liner notes of Jozef Joris, Honorary Director of the Lemmens Institute, to the 1991 recording.
