= Honi HaMe'agel =

Jewish scholar of the 1st-century BC

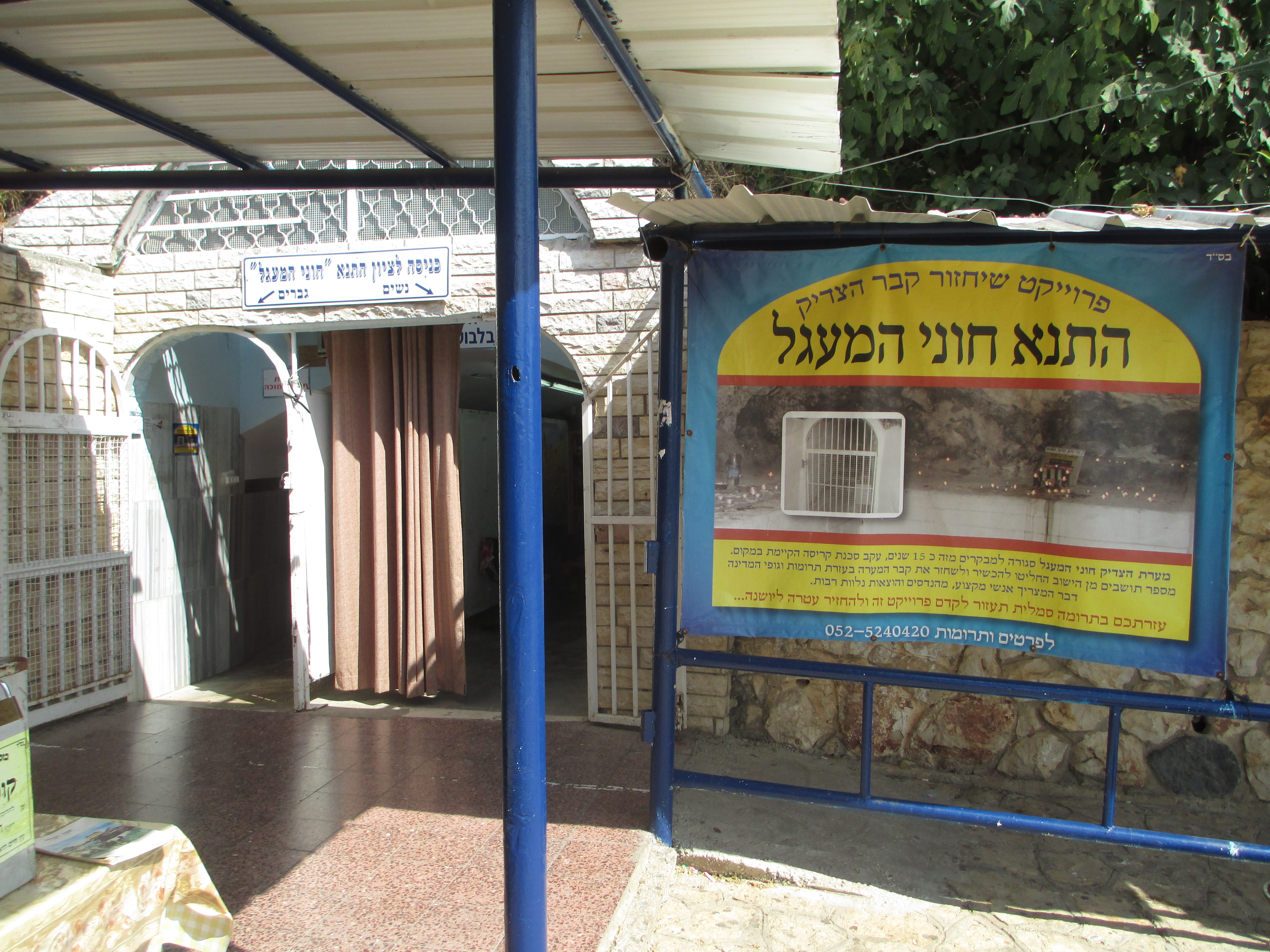

Personal life
- Born: 2nd century BC

Religious life
- Religion: Judaism

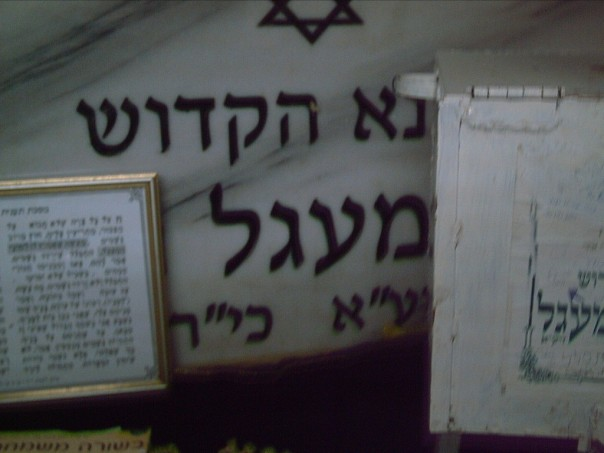
Gravestone of Honi

Honi HaMe'agel (Hebrew: חוני המעגל, romanized: Ḥōnī hamMəʿaggēl, lit. 'Honi the circler') was a 1st-century BC Jewish scholar prior to the age of the tannaim, the scholars from whose teachings the Mishnah was derived.

During this period, a variety of religious movements and splinter groups developed amongst the Jews in Judea. Several individuals claimed to be miracle workers in the tradition of Elijah and Elisha, the ancient Jewish prophets. The Babylonian and Jerusalem Talmuds both provide examples of such Jewish miracle workers, including Honi, such as in Jerusalem Talmud Taanit 3:10, 66d and Babylonian Talmud Taanit 19a; 23a.

== Circle drawing incident ==
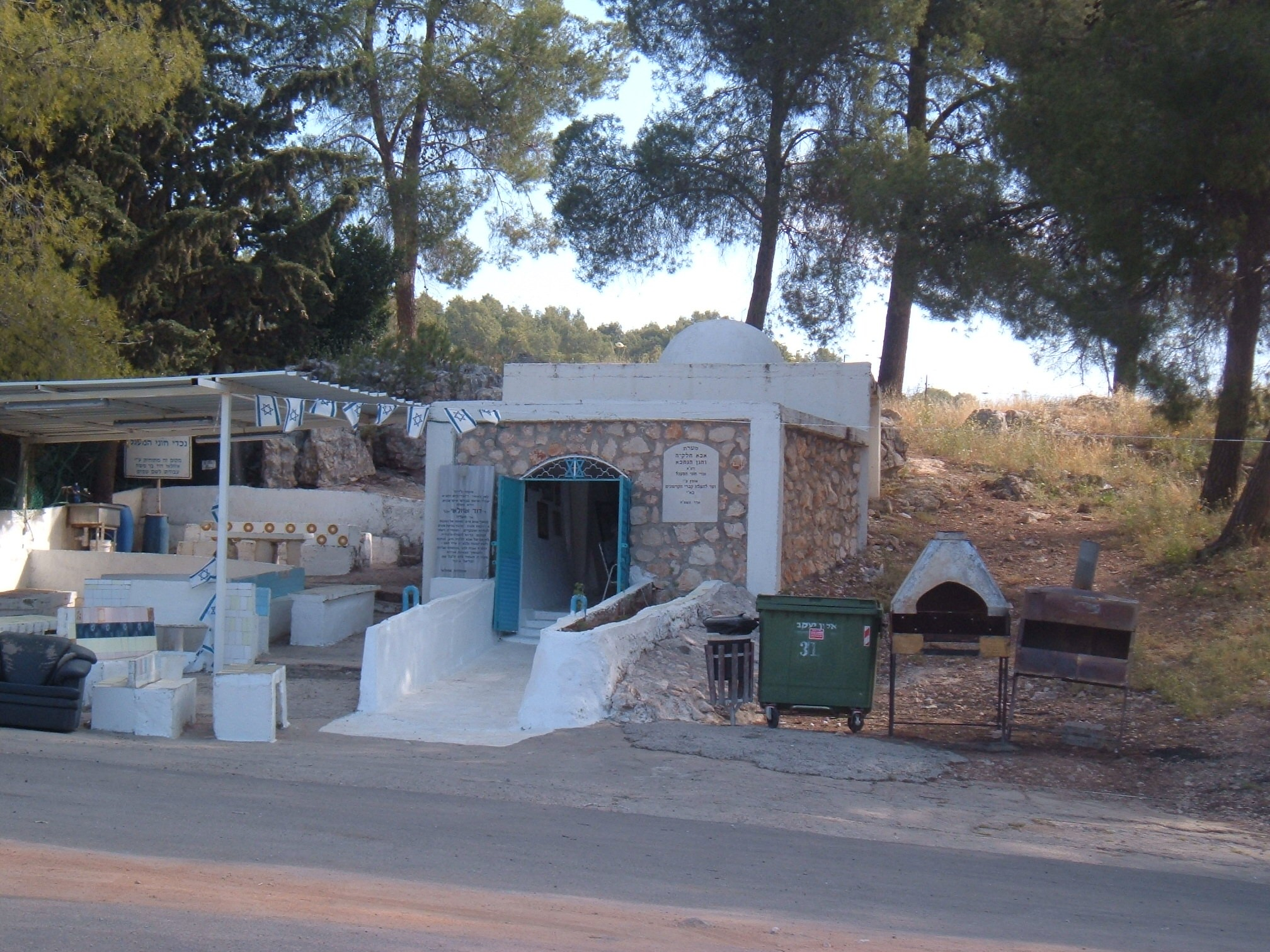
Tomb of Honi HaMe'agel's grandsons in Hatzor HaGlilit, Galilee

His surname is derived from an incident in which, according to the Babylonian Talmud, his prayer for rain was miraculously answered. On one occasion, when God did not send rain well into the winter (in Israel, it rains mainly in the winter), Honi drew a circle in the dust, stood inside it, and informed God that he would not move until it rained. When it began to drizzle, Honi told God that he was not satisfied and expected more rain; it then began to pour. He explained that he wanted a calm rain, at which point the rain calmed to a normal rain.

He was almost put into herem (excommunication) for the above incident in which he showed "dishonor" to God, as if he had imposed himself upon God. However, Simeon ben Shetach, the brother of Salome Alexandra, queen regnant of Hasmonean Judah, excused him, saying that Honi had a special relationship with God.

Two variations of this story appear in the Talmud, in Taanit 19a and 23a.

== Extended sleep story ==
Two variations of a story are recorded—in the Babylonian and Jerusalem Talmuds—in which Honi fell asleep for decades before awakening. The story provides a Jewish version on the theme of a person or persons (as the Seven Sleepers) sleeping for many decades and waking to find a changed world—a theme originating in the story of Epimenides—found in many divergent cultures and traditions, and in modern times associated especially with the Rip Van Winkle story.

=== In the Babylonian Talmud (Carob tree story) ===
The Babylonian Talmud tells the following story, in which Honi slept for 70 years, before awaking and then dying:

Rabbi Yohanan said: "This righteous man Honi was troubled throughout the whole of his life concerning the meaning of the verse, 'A Song of Ascents: When the Lord brought back those that returned to Zion, we were like dreamers' (Psalms 126:1). [Honi asked] Is it possible for seventy years to be like a dream? How could anyone sleep for seventy years?"

One day Honi was journeying on the road and he saw a man planting a carob tree. He asked, "How long does it take for this tree to bear fruit?" The man replied: "Seventy years." Honi then further asked him: "Are you certain that you will live another seventy years?" The man replied: "I found already grown carob trees in the world; as my forefathers planted those for me, so I too plant these for my children."

Honi sat down to have a meal and sleep overcame him. As he slept a rocky formation enclosed upon him which hid him from sight and he slept for seventy years. When he awoke he saw a man gathering the fruit of the carob tree and Honi asked him, "Are you the man who planted the tree?" The man replied: "I am his grandson." Thereupon Honi exclaimed: "It is clear that I have slept for seventy years." He then caught sight of his ass which had given birth to several generations of mules, and he returned home. There he inquired, "Is the son of Honi the Circle-Drawer still alive?" The people answered him, "His son is no more, but his grandson is still living." Thereupon he said to them: "I am Honi the Circle-Drawer," but no one would believe him.

He then repaired to the beit hamidrash study hall and there he overheard the scholars say, "The law is as clear to us as in the days of Honi the Circle-Drawer," for whenever he came to the beit hamidrash he would settle for the scholars any difficulty that they had. Whereupon he called out, "I am he!" But the scholars would not believe him nor did they give him the honor due to him. This hurt him greatly and he prayed for mercy, and he died. Raba said: "Hence the saying, 'Either companionship or death.'"

=== Descendants ===
The Babylonian Talmud Taanit 23b:8 refers to Honi as the maternal grandfather of Hanan ha-Nehba. The Babylonian Talmud Taanit.23a.18 says Abba Hilkiah is the paternal grandson of Honi.

=== In the Jerusalem Talmud ===
In the Jerusalem Talmud, the circle-drawing story is notably missing (except in the Mishnah), and the sleep theme does not manifest as the carob story. Instead, the story is about Honi sleeping in a cave for seventy years, then returning to see that the Temple in Jerusalem had been rebuilt, where he was able to prove his identity:

Said R. Yudan Giria: "This is Honi the Circle Maker [of M. Ta. 3:9], the grandson of Honi the Circle Maker. Near the time of the destruction of the [First] Temple, he went out to a mountain to his workers. Before he got there, it rained. He went into a cave. Once he sat down there he fell asleep. He remained sound asleep for seventy years, until the Temple was destroyed and it was rebuilt a second time. At the end of the seventy years he awoke from his sleep. He went out of the cave, and he saw a world completely changed. An area that had been planted with vineyards now produced olives, and an area planted with olives now produced grain. He asked the people of the district, "What has happened in the world?" They said to him, "And don't you know what has happened?" He said to them, "No." They said to him, "Who are you?" He said to them, "Honi the Circle Maker." They said to him, "We heard that when he would go into the Temple courtyard, it would be illuminated." He went in and illuminated the place and recited the following verse of Scripture, "When the Lord restored the fortune of Zion, we were like those who dream" (Ps. 126:1).

Unlike the Babylonian Talmud story, the account in the Jerusalem Talmud does not describe Honi's death. This more closely resembles the Epimenides sleep story in which Epimenides can pass on his message. According to one source, this difference could be specifically because of the two pieces this story is based on: Honi's death in Josephus and the Epimenides sleep theme. The idea would be that in the Jerusalem Talmud's case, the author more closely followed the Epimenides story to get their point across, while in the Babylonian Talmud, the author had a more metaphorical approach to his death in Josephus. The story of Honi the Circle-Maker is also quoted in Midrash Tehillim, chapter 126.

== Death ==
According to Josephus in Antiquities of the Jews, Honi met his end in the context of conflict between the Hasmonean brothers Hyrcanus II, backed by the Pharisees and advised by Antipater the Idumaean, and Aristobulus II, backed by the Sadducees. Around 63 BCE, Honi was captured by the followers of Hyrcanus besieging Jerusalem and was asked to pray for the demise of their opponents. Honi, however, prayed: "Lord of the universe, as the besieged and the besiegers both belong to Your people, I beseech You not to answer the evil prayers of either." After this, the followers of Hyrcanus stoned him to death.

The Babylonian Talmud records a different story of his death, as part of the aforementioned carob tree story. Scholars like Maharsha reconcile the accounts by suggesting that Josephus reflects popular belief, while the Talmud preserves the true story, using synthesis to harmonize the narratives. Rabbi Jehiel Heilprin in Seder HaDoroth proposes that there were two figures named Honi, one from each account, effectively resolving the contradiction. Modern scholars like Zvi Ron allegorize the Talmudic story, interpreting it as a moral lesson about the consequences of refusing to mediate conflict, while Moshe Simon-Shoshan rejects the Talmudic account as ahistorical, viewing it as a literary construct. Likewise, Rabbi Reuven Chaim Klein paper demonstrates how different approaches (such as synthesis, allegorization, and rejection) can be used to address discrepancies in rabbinic historical accounts, highlighting the flexibility and creativity required to reconcile rabbinic and external sources.

Honi's grave is found near the town of Hatzor HaGlilit in northern Israel.

His Yahrzeit is 5 Iyar.

== Explanation of the word HaMe'agel ==
"HaMe'agel" in Hebrew means "circle maker". Samuel Klein suggested that the term "circle maker" relates to Honi's profession as a roofer (in Hebrew Me'agel). It was customary for sages in the Talmud to be called by their profession. Rollers for compressing plaster and mud on roofs during the Hellenistic period were found at Mount Gerizim. In the time of Honi, these rollers are the tools of the trade for a me'agel/circle maker/roofer. The Mishna in Maakot 2:1 calls this roofer a "circle maker" ("me'agel"). The term circle maker has a double meaning - profession and a label to describe Honi's drawing circles to interact with God.

Seder HaDoroth however, writes that the name is toponymic, as Honi was from a town named Maglu (see Seder HaTanna'im VehaAmora'im).

== See also ==
- Epimenides
- Line in the sand
- Magic circle
- Rainmaking (ritual)
- Rip Van Winkle
- Seven Sleepers and Khidr
- Zisurrû
