= Abba Hilkiah =

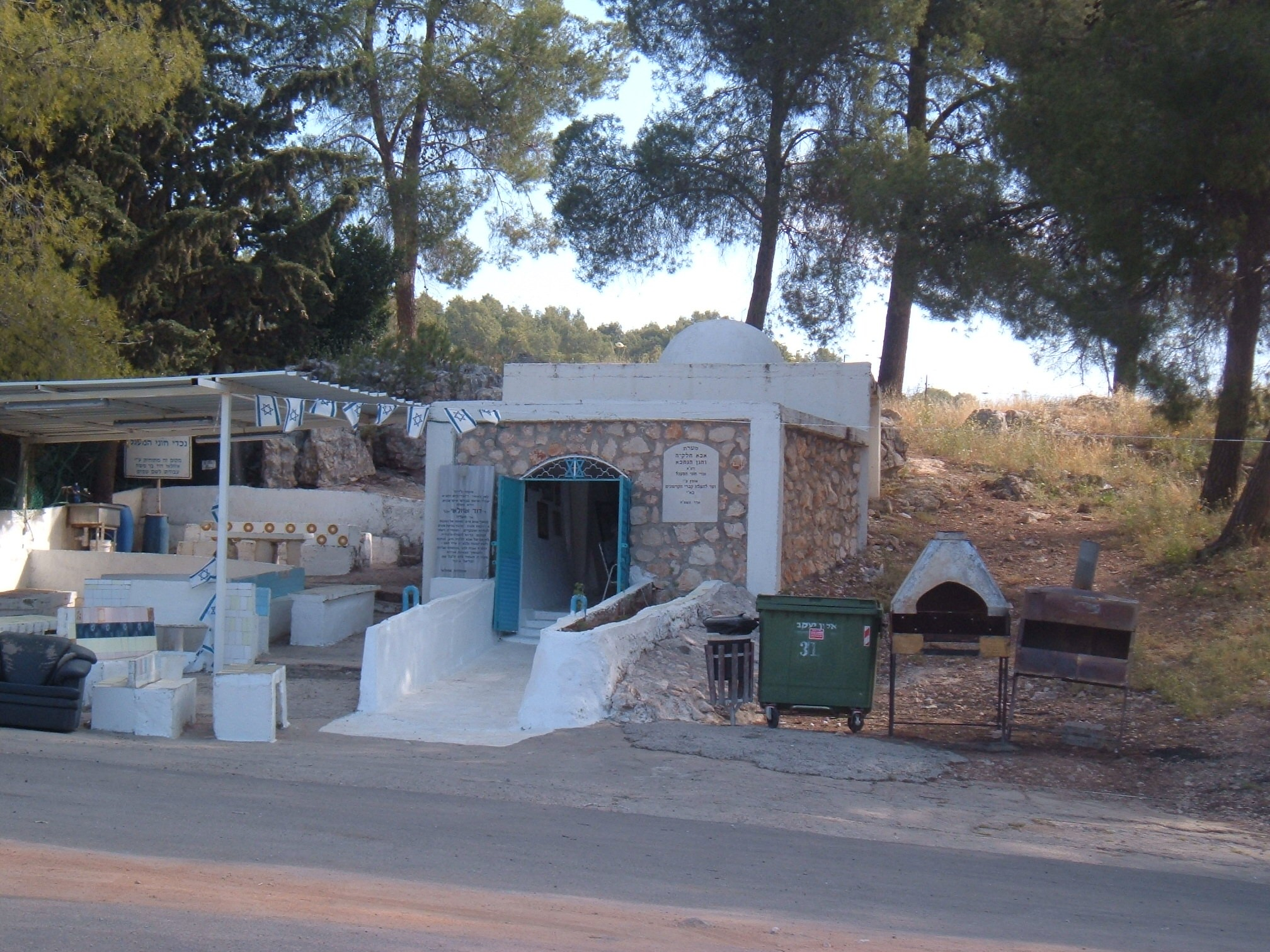
Tomb sites attributed to Abba Hilkiah and Hanan ha-Nehba, both grandchildren of Honi HaMe'agel

Abba Hilkiah (or Abba Hilkiahu; Hebrew: אבא חלקיה, Abba helkia) was a tannaic sage, and a grandson of Honi HaMe'agel. The Talmud cites him as exceptionally scrupulous in his work and behavior.

Just like his well-known grandfather, who was known for his abilities to induce rain by means of prayers and other supernatural means, so was Hilkiah known for his abilities to induce rain by his prayers. For this reason, during one of the periods of the drought, as the Talmud records the occasion, the sages sent him a delegation of two disciples, to ask him to pray for rain. The disciples found him working in the field as a salaried employee, and so he failed to address even their courtesy when they greeted him, until he was done with his work at the field, and only then did they make their way to his home together, while they observe some strange behaviors of Hilkiah. Abba Hilkiah, who already understood by himself the reason for the disciples' visit, failed, in his humbleness nature, to even listen to their appeals, and immediately upon arrival at his house, he and his wife ascended to the attic, where they made a prayer plea for rain to come, a plea that was immediately answered by heaven. Rain clouds started appearing in the direction where his wife prayed, and the rain started tapping. Abba Hilkiah then returned to his visitors, and while pretending to be naive, he asked them for their wishes. The disciples did not fall into the trap, and were immediately able to comprehend that Hilkiah induced the rain, and had asked him on his strange behaviors that they previously observed on their way to his home, as well as for the reason that the rain came from the direction his wife prayed and not his. Hilkiah explained everything to them, that the reason his wife's plea was answered first was because she helps the needy who knock on her door, by handing them cooked food, while he only hands them money, so they have to bother to go buy it. But his alternative reason is perhaps more fundamental: "There had been robbers in my street, and I prayed to G‑d to get rid of them, but my wife prayed that they should mend their ways!"

== See also ==
- Yisroel Meir Gabbai
