= Seder HaDoroth =

Book by Yeḥiʾēl Ben-Shelomoh Hailprin

Jehiel Heilprin, Seder HaDoroth, 5568 AM

The Seder HaDorot or "Book of Generations" (completed 1725, published 1769) by Lithuanian Rabbi Jehiel Heilprin (1660–1746) is a Hebrew-language chronological work that serves as a depot of multiple Hebrew language chronological books and manuscripts. The work presents all given dates in the Hebrew calendar format.

As well, Heilprin analyzed alternating and sometimes conflicting dates to produce a final decision and/or at times presents two plausible dates for a given event.

== Composition ==
This work consists of three independent volumes or parts:

- The first of these, entitled Yemot 'Olam, is a history from the Creation down to his own time. The author always endeavors to give, by means of calculation, the dates of Biblical personages. He bases his work on the Yuḥasin of Abraham Zacuto, on the Shalshelet HaKabbalah of Gedaliah ibn Yaḥya, and on the Ẓemaḥ Dawid of David Gans. It seems that this first part was written when the author was still young, for the last event which he registered was one occurring in 1697.
- The second part, Seder HaTanna'im WehaAmora'im, contains lists of the Tannaim and Amoraim in alphabetical order with their dates.
- The third part is a kind of catalogue containing first the names of all the authors, then those of their works, both arranged in alphabetical order. Heilprin based this part on the Sifte Yeshenim of Shabbethai Bass, but added a great number of other titles. He states in the preface the many advantages of a knowledge of the chronological order of the Talmudists, which indeed in certain cases is absolutely necessary.

The whole work is followed by notes on the Talmud, also arranged in alphabetical order. It was published for the first time by Heilprin's grandson, Judah Löb Heilprin, at Karlsruhe in 1769. There exist several other editions, the latest being the revised one of Naphtali Maskileison, son of Abraham Maskileison Warsaw, 1882.

Of Heilprin's numerous other works mentioned in the Seder HaDorot, the only one which has been published is Erke HaKinnuyim, a dictionary of synonyms and homonyms occurring in the Bible, Talmud, and other works, chiefly Kabalistic (Dyhernfurth, 1806).

== Example (Israel's sojourn in Egypt) ==
Year	Event
609 BCE	Death of Josiah
609–598 BCE	Reign of Jehoiakim (succeeded Jehoahaz, who replaced Josiah but reigned only 3 months)
598/7 BCE	Reign of Jehoiachin (or Jeconiah, reigned 3 months). Siege and fall of Jerusalem. First deportation, 16 March 597
597 BCE	Zedekiah made king of Judah by Nebuchadnezzar II of Babylon
594 BCE	Anti-Babylonian conspiracy
588 BCE	Siege and fall of Jerusalem. Second deportation July/August 587
583 BCE	Gedaliah the Babylonian-appointed governor of Yehud Province assassinated. Many Jews flee to Egypt and a possible third deportation to Babylon
562 BCE	Release of Jehoiachin after 37 years in a Babylonian prison. He remains in Babylon
538 BCE	Persians conquer Babylon (October)
538 BCE	"Decree of Cyrus" allows Jews to return to Jerusalem
520–515 BCE	Return by many Jews to Yehud under Zerubbabel and Joshua the High Priest. Foundations of Second Temple laid
