= In convertendo Dominus (Rameau) =

Setting by Jean-Philippe Rameau of In convertendo Dominus

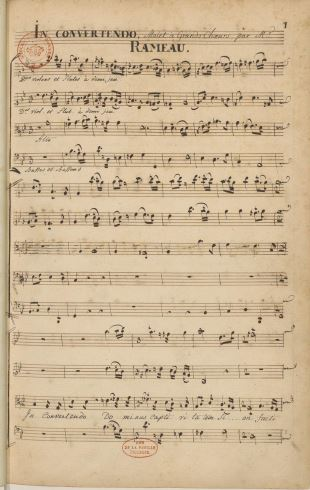
Title page of manuscript of Rameau's In convertendo. (1751 version)

In convertendo Dominus (When the Lord turned [the captivity of Zion]), sometimes referred to as In convertendo, is a setting by Jean-Philippe Rameau of In convertendo Dominus, the Latin version of Psalm 126, (thus numbered in the King James Bible, number 125 in the Latin psalters). It is listed as RCT 14 in the Rameau Catalogue Thématique of Sylvie Bouissou and Denis Herlin.

== Composition ==
In convertendo is one of the four surviving church works of Rameau's early career, dating to the period 1710-1714 when he was working in Dijon or Lyon; other similar works are known to be lost. The work was rewritten and updated in style for a performance at the Concert spirituel in Paris in 1751. The manuscript of the 1751 version, now in the Bibliothèque nationale de France, was originally in the collection of Jacques Joseph Marie Decroix, the lawyer and friend of Rameau who built a large collection of his manuscripts after the composer's death. The motet is scored for soloists, choir, strings and woodwind, and includes, after the fourth verse, a verse not in the original psalm, Laudate nomen Deo cum cantico (Praise the name of God in song). The final verse is composed to include a fugue which, in the opinion of Reiner E. Moritz, "can stand direct comparison with ... Rameau's contemporary J. S. Bach".

== Text ==
The Latin text is given below alongside the translation of the psalm in the King James Bible. The text in square brackets is not in the original psalm.

1 In convertendo Dominus captivitatem Sion, facti sumus sicut consolati.
2 Tunc repletum est gaudio os nostrum, et lingua nostra exsultatione. Tunc dicent inter gentes: Magnificavit Dominus facere cum eis.
3 Magnificavit Dominus facere nobiscum; facti sumus lætantes.
4 Converte, Domine, captivitatem nostram, sicut torrens in austro.
[Laudate nomen Deo cum cantico.]
5 Qui seminant in lacrimis, in exsultatione metent.
6 Euntes ibant et flebant, mittentes semina sua. Venientes autem venient cum exsultatione, portantes manipulos suos.

1 When the Lord turned again the captivity of Zion, we were like them that dream.
2 Then was our mouth filled with laughter, and our tongue with singing: then said they among the heathen, The Lord hath done great things for them.
3 The Lord hath done great things for us; whereof we are glad.
4 Turn again our captivity, O Lord, as the streams in the south.
[Praise the name of God in song.]
5 They that sow in tears shall reap in joy.
6 He that goeth forth and weepeth, bearing precious seed, shall doubtless come again with rejoicing, bringing his sheaves with him.

== Recordings ==
- William Christie (conductor), Les Arts Florissants chorus and orchestra. CD. Erato, 1995.
- William Christie (conductor), Les Arts Florissants chorus and orchestra. DVD. Opus Arte, 2006.
- Hervé Niquet (conductor), Le Concert Spirituel. CD. FNAC Music, 1983.
- Philippe Herreweghe (conductor), Paris Chapelle Royale Chorus and Ghent Collegium Vocale. CD. Harmonia Mundi, n.d.

== Notes and references ==
Notes

Sources

- Bouissou, S. and Herlin, D. (2007). Jean-Philippe Rameau : Catalogue thématique des œuvres musicales (T. 1, Musique instrumentale. Musique vocale religieuse et profane). Paris: CNRS Édition et Éditions de la BnF,
- Moritz, Reiner E. (2004). "True music is the language of the heart". Accompanying booklet to DVD recording of In convertendo, Opus Arte OA 0956D, pp. [5] - [9].
- Rameau, Jean-Philippe, ed. Camille Saint-Saëns (1898). Oeuvres Complètes, Tome 4 . Paris:Durand. Accessed on IMSLP 1 January 2015.
- Sadler, Graham (1978). "A Letter from Claude-François Rameau to J. J. M. Decroix", Music & Letters, vol. 59, no. 2 (Apr. 1978), pp. 139-147. JSTOR 734133 (subscription required).
- Sadler, Graham (1983). "Rameau: Les grands motets" (review), The Musical Times, vol. 124, no. 1687, Sep. 1983, p. 577. JSTOR 962424 (subscription required).
- Sadler, Graham and Thomas Christensen (n.d.) "Rameau, Jean-Philippe", in Oxford Music Online, accessed 1 January 2015.(subscription required)
