= Psalm 126 =

Biblical psalm

- "When the Lord turned again the captivity of Zion"
- Song of Ascents
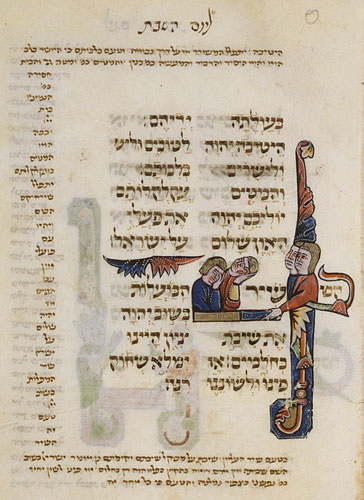
- Psalm 126 in the Parma Psalter
- Other name: Psalm 125; "In convertendo Dominus"
- Language: Hebrew (original)

Psalm 126
- ← Psalm 125 Psalm 127 →
- Book: Book of Psalms
- Hebrew Bible part: Ketuvim
- Order in the Hebrew part: 1
- Category: Sifrei Emet
- Christian Bible part: Old Testament
- Order in the Christian part: 19

Psalm 126 is the 126th psalm of the Book of Psalms, beginning in English in the King James Version: "When the Lord turned again the captivity of Zion, we were like them that dream". In Latin, it is known as In convertendo Dominus. It is one of the fifteen Songs of Ascent in the Book of Psalms whose opening words in Hebrew are "Shir HaMaalot" (שיר המעלות בשוב ה’, a Song of Ascents). In the slightly different numbering system used in the Greek Septuagint version of the Bible and in the Latin Vulgate, this psalm is Psalm 125.

This six-verse psalm forms a regular part of Jewish, Catholic, Lutheran, Anglican and other Protestant liturgies. It is well known in Judaism as the preliminary psalm recited before the Birkat Hamazon (Grace After Meals) on Shabbat and Jewish holidays, and as such is sung to a wide variety of melodies. It has also inspired hymns based on it, and has often been set to music, such as Jean-Philippe Rameau and Jules Van Nuffel who set the psalm in Latin.

Parts of this psalm have been singled out, for example They that sow in tears shall reap in joy is included in Ein deutsches Requiem by Johannes Brahms.

== Background and themes ==
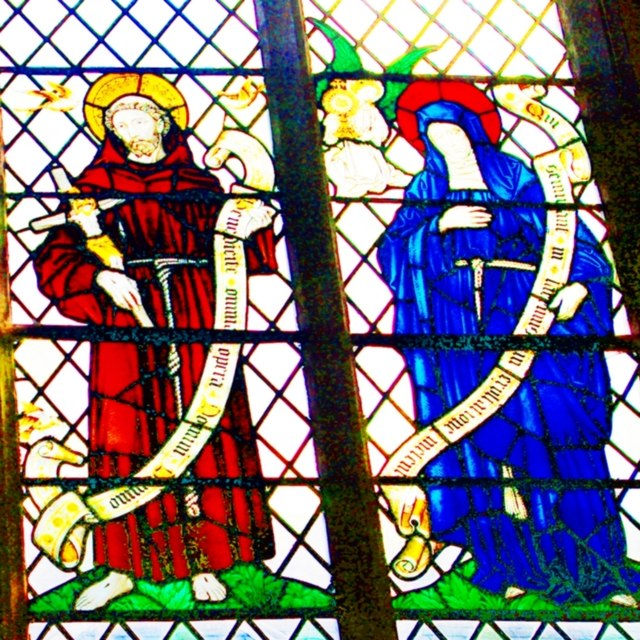
St. Francis and St. Monica on a stained glass window at Little St Mary's Church, Cambridge, England. Monica's phylactery contains verse 5 of Psalm 126 in Latin, for she long prayed for the conversion to Christianity of her son Augustine.

Psalm 126 expresses the themes of redemption and joy and gratitude to God. According to Matthew Henry, it was likely written upon the return of the Israelites from Babylonian captivity. In Henry's view, the psalm was written either by Ezra, who led the nation at that time, or by one of the Jewish prophets. Jewish scholarship pairs this psalm with Psalm 137, with Psalm 137 commemorating the beginning of the Babylonian exile, and Psalm 126 describing the end of that exile. The grammatical structure of the psalm, however, suggests that it is talking both about a past redemption (from Babylonian captivity, in verse 1) and a future redemption (the permanent return of the exiles at the end of days, in verse 4). Alternately, modern Jewish commentators suggest that the second half of the psalm refers to the redemption of the land of Israel from agricultural drought.

The Talmud (Ta'anit 23a) mentions this psalm in the context of the famous story of Honi ha-M'agel, who slept for seventy years. Before he fell asleep, Honi saw an old man planting a carob tree that would not bear fruit for seventy years. The Talmud begins,

Rabbi Yohanan said: This righteous man [Honi HaMa'agel] was troubled throughout the whole of his life about the meaning of the verse from Psalms 126, "A Song of Ascents, When the Lord brought back those that returned to Zion, we will be like dreamers." He wondered: Is it possible for one man to live long enough to dream continuously for seventy years? [As it is written, "For the Lord said: When Babylon's seventy years are over, I will take note of and I will fulfill you to my promise of favor -- to bring you back to this place" (Jeremiah 29:10).]

Honi then ate a meal and fell asleep for seventy years. When he awoke, he saw the man's grandson gathering the fruits of the carob tree. Honi returned to the study hall and heard scholars discussing laws that he himself had explicated. But they did not believe that he was still alive, and did not show him honor.

Alexander Kirkpatrick notes an affinity of this psalm with Psalm 85, which begins LORD, thou hast been favourable unto thy land.

== Uses ==
=== Judaism ===
Psalm 126 is customarily recited by Ashkenazim before the Birkat Hamazon (Grace After Meals) on Shabbat, Rosh Chodesh, and Jewish holidays. Some say it on other days when Tachanun is not said. While on ordinary weekdays, Psalm 137 is traditionally recited before the Birkat Hamazon, that psalm's theme of the Destruction of the Temple is considered inappropriate for joyous occasions and holidays. For this reason, Psalm 126 is said before the Birkat Hamazon on Shabbat and Jewish holidays, as well as at other celebratory meals such as those at a Jewish wedding, brit milah, and pidyon haben.

At these times, Psalm 126 is customarily sung in full. The psalm lends itself to a wide variety of melodies due to its simple, repeating structure, and as such has many musical versions popularized by synagogue groups, youth organizations, summer camps, and others. Melodies have been borrowed from other liturgical poems, such as El Adon. German-speaking Jews have a tradition of adapting the liturgical melodies of each holiday's synagogue services to the singing of Psalm 126 at the table. Whereas fifteen psalms begin with the Masoretic superscription "Shir Hama'alot" (Song of Ascents), Psalm 126 is eponymously called "Shir Hama'alot" due to its prevalent use.

Psalm 126 is one of the fifteen Songs of Ascents recited in some communities after the Shabbat afternoon prayer in the period between Sukkot and Shabbat HaGadol (the Shabbat prior to Passover).

Verse 4 is part of Selichot.

=== Catholic Church ===
According to the Rule of St. Benedict of 530, this Psalm was assigned to the Office of none from Tuesday until Saturday, and following Psalm 127 and Psalm 128.

Currently, in the Liturgy of the Hours, Psalm 126 is recited or sung at vespers on the Wednesday of the third week of the four weekly liturgical cycle. In the liturgy of the Mass, it is read on the 30th Sunday in Ordinary Time of the year B6, the second Sunday of Advent and 5th Sunday of Lent that year.

=== Coptic Orthodox Church ===
In the Agpeya, the Coptic Church's book of hours, this psalm is prayed in the office of Vespers and the second watch of the Midnight office.

=== Pentecostal ===
This psalm is a Psalm of praise. It is used in moments of praise and to remind the Pentecostal community that redemption is coming and when it comes, you may not believe it - we were like those who dream!

=== Secular usage ===
In keeping with its theme of redemption, Psalm 126 was proposed by Religious Zionists to be the national anthem of the State of Israel. It, along with at least eleven other proposals, was ultimately passed over in favor of "Hatikvah", which was ratified as the official national anthem in 2004.

Israeli Prime Minister Menachem Begin recited Psalm 126 on the White House lawn when he signed the second of the Camp David Accords with Egyptian President Anwar Sadat on March 26, 1979.

== Musical settings ==
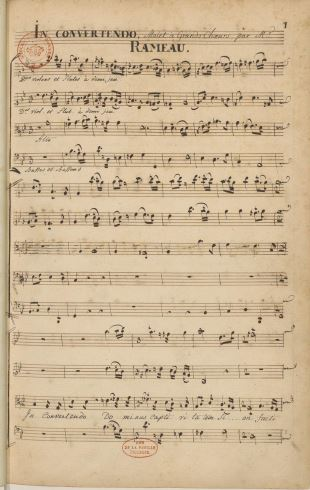
Title page of the manuscript of Rameau's In convertendo (1751 version)

The complete psalm was set in Latin as a motet for a cappella choir by composers including George de La Hèle, Lorenzo Perosi, Jean-Noël Marchand, Dmitri Bortnyansky (1777). Marc-Antoine Charpentier compose in 1670 one "In convertendo Dominus", H.169, for soloists, double chorus, strings and continuo. Also, Sébastien de Brossard, Michel-Richard de Lalande, Patrick Douglas. Jean-Philippe Rameau composed In convertendo Dominus c. 1710, for choir and orchestra. Jules Van Nuffel wrote a setting for mixed choir and organ as his Op. 32 in 1926. Giovanni Bernardino Nanino set alternate verses for a cappella choir.

Heinrich Schütz composed a setting of a metred paraphrase in German of the psalm, "Wenn Gott einmal erlösen wird", SWV 231, for the Becker Psalter, published first in 1628. Other settings in German were made by Johann Hermann Schein and Heinrich Hartmann. Verses 5 and 6 were set by Johannes Brahms within the first movement of Ein deutsches Requiem, for choir and orchestra. Friedrich Kiel set the verses 5 and 6 as No. 5 of his Six Motets, Op. 82, published in 1883.

Johann Sebastian Bach used the second verse in German as the text for the opening movement of his Christmas cantata Unser Mund sei voll Lachens, BWV 110 (1725).

Verses of the psalm have been set in English by composers including William Byrd and Charles Villiers Stanford. Jules van Nuffel set the complete psalm in Latin, In convertendo Dominus, in 1926.

In 1998, Philip Glass composed a setting in which the chorus sings worldless syllables and a narrator recites the text in English.

The psalm is also sung to secular melodies such as "Waltzing Matilda", "The Longest Time","It's a Small World", Beethoven's Ninth, and college football songs, among many others.

Sons of Korah included a setting of Psalm 126 on their 2000 album, "Redemption Songs."

The psalm inspired the hymn Bringing in the Sheaves, the lyrics were written in 1874 by Knowles Shaw, now usually set to a tune by George Minor, written in 1880.

== Text ==
The following table shows the Hebrew text of the Psalm with vowels, alongside the Koine Greek text in the Septuagint and the English translation from the King James Version. Note that the meaning can slightly differ between these versions, as the Septuagint and the Masoretic Text come from different textual traditions. (Note: A 1917 translation directly from Hebrew to English by the Jewish Publication Society can be found here or here, and an 1844 translation directly from the Septuagint by L. C. L. Brenton can be found here. Both translations are in the public domain.) In the Septuagint, this psalm is numbered Psalm 125.

#	Hebrew	English	Greek
1	שִׁ֗יר הַֽמַּ֫עֲל֥וֹת בְּשׁ֣וּב יְ֭הֹוָה אֶת־שִׁיבַ֣ת צִיּ֑וֹן הָ֝יִ֗ינוּ כְּחֹלְמִֽים׃	(A Song of degrees.) When the Lord turned again the captivity of Zion, we were like them that dream.	᾿ῼδὴ τῶν ἀναβαθμῶν. - ΕΝ Τῼ ἐπιστρέψαι Κύριον τὴν αἰχμαλωσίαν Σιὼν ἐγενήθημεν ὡσεὶ παρακεκλημένοι.
2	אָ֤ז יִמָּלֵ֪א שְׂח֡וֹק פִּינוּ֮ וּלְשׁוֹנֵ֢נוּ רִ֫נָּ֥ה אָ֭ז יֹאמְר֣וּ בַגּוֹיִ֑ם הִגְדִּ֥יל יְ֝הֹוָ֗ה לַעֲשׂ֥וֹת עִם־אֵֽלֶּה׃	Then was our mouth filled with laughter, and our tongue with singing: then said they among the heathen, The Lord hath done great things for them.	τότε ἐπλήσθη χαρᾶς τὸ στόμα ἡμῶν καὶ ἡ γλῶσσα ἡμῶν ἀγαλλιάσεως. τότε ἐροῦσιν ἐν τοῖς ἔθνεσιν· ἐμεγάλυνε Κύριος τοῦ ποιῆσαι μετ᾿ αὐτῶν.
3	הִגְדִּ֣יל יְ֭הֹוָה לַעֲשׂ֥וֹת עִמָּ֗נוּ הָיִ֥ינוּ שְׂמֵחִֽים׃	The Lord hath done great things for us; whereof we are glad.	ἐμεγάλυνε Κύριος τοῦ ποιῆσαι μεθ᾿ ἡμῶν, ἐγενήθημεν εὐφραινόμενοι.
4	שׁוּבָ֣ה יְ֭הֹוָה אֶת־[שְׁבִיתֵ֑נוּ] (שבותנו) כַּאֲפִיקִ֥ים בַּנֶּֽגֶב׃	Turn again our captivity, O Lord, as the streams in the south.	ἐπίστρεψον, Κύριε, τὴν αἰχμαλωσίαν ἡμῶν ὡς χειμάρρους ἐν τῷ νότῳ.
5	הַזֹּרְעִ֥ים בְּדִמְעָ֗ה בְּרִנָּ֥ה יִקְצֹֽרוּ׃	They that sow in tears shall reap in joy.	οἱ σπείροντες ἐν δάκρυσιν ἐν ἀγαλλιάσει θεριοῦσι.
6	הָ֘ל֤וֹךְ יֵלֵ֨ךְ ׀ וּבָכֹה֮ נֹשֵׂ֢א מֶשֶׁךְ־הַ֫זָּ֥רַע בֹּא־יָבֹ֥א בְרִנָּ֑ה נֹ֝שֵׂ֗א אֲלֻמֹּתָֽיו׃	He that goeth forth and weepeth, bearing precious seed, shall doubtless come again with rejoicing, bringing his sheaves with him.	πορευόμενοι ἐπορεύοντο καὶ ἔκλαιον βάλλοντες τὰ σπέρματα αὐτῶν· ἐρχόμενοι δὲ ἥξουσιν ἐν ἀγαλλιάσει αἴροντες τὰ δράγματα αὐτῶν.

=== Other translations ===
The New International Version and the Revised Standard Version refer to "the south" in verse 4 as "the Negev".

== See also ==
- Preliminary Psalms

== Sources ==
- Scherman, Rabbi Nosson (2003). The Complete Artscroll Siddur (3rd ed.). Mesorah Publications, Ltd. ISBN 9780899066509.
