= Heinz Kuhn (academic) =

German-born British Coptologist

Karl Heinz Kuhn, FBA (2 August 1919 – 10 June 2013) was a German-born British Coptologist. He was Professor of Coptic at Durham University from 1982 to 1984.

Born to a Jewish family in the Free City of Danzig, Kuhn grew up in Germany, where his family originated. In 1939, he was sent abroad to join his sister in South West Africa, but was stranded in Britain at the outbreak of the war. He was interned as an enemy alien, for period in Canada, before being freed in 1941, and worked as a labourer for a war agricultural executive committee.

After the war, Kuhn studied at Durham University, where he would spend his entire career. After graduating with a BA in 1949, he received a Scarbrough Research Studentship, and graduated with a PhD in 1952. He was research fellow in arts at Durham from 1953 to 1955, when he was made a lecturer (later senior lecturer) in Hebrew and Aramaic. He was promoted reader in Coptic in 1977, and given a personal chair in Coptic, which he held from 1982 until his retirement two years later.

He was elected a Fellow of the British Academy in 1987.
