= Radashkovichy =

Radashkovichy Радашковічы (Belarusian) Радошковичи (Russian)
- Urban-type settlement
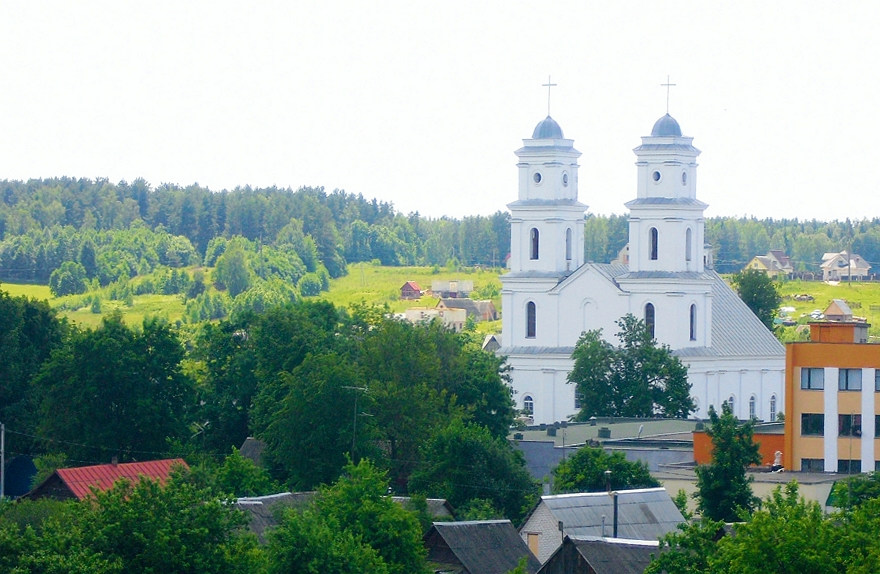

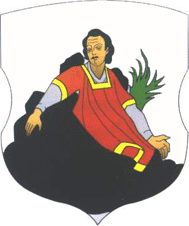
- Flag Coat of arms
- Interactive map of Radashkovichy
- Location within Belarus
- Coordinates: 54°9′N 27°14′E
- Country: Belarus
- Region: Minsk Region
- District: Maladzyechna District

Population (2026)
  - Total: 6,100
- Time zone: UTC+3 (MSK)

Radashkovichy (Note: Belarusian: Радашковічы, romanized: Radaškovičy; Russian: Радошковичи, romanized: Radoshkovichi; Polish: Radoszkowicze; Lithuanian: Radaškonys.) is an urban-type settlement in Maladzyechna District, Minsk Region, Belarus. As of 2026, it has a population of 6,100.

A watershed of the Vilyeyka-Minsk water system is located nearby.

== History ==
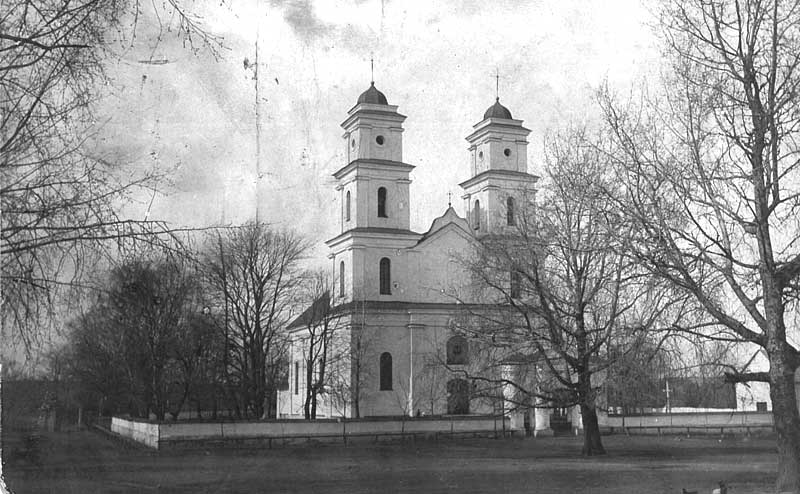
Holy Trinity church in the 1930s

Radoszkowicze was a royal town, administratively located in the Mińsk County in the Mińsk Voivodeship of the Polish–Lithuanian Commonwealth. In 1708, during the Great Northern War, King Charles XII of Sweden stayed in the town for 11 weeks.

Following the Second Partition of Poland (1793), it was annexed by the Russian Empire, within which it belonged to the Vileysky Uyezd of the Vilna Governorate. In the interbellum, it was part of reborn Poland, within which it was administratively located in the Wilno District 1919–1920, then the Nowogródek Voivodeship in 1921–1922, Wilno Land in 1922–1926, and Wilno Voivodeship afterwards.

Following the invasion of Poland during World War II in September 1939, it was occupied by the Soviet Union until 1941, then by Germany until 1944, and re-occupied by the Soviet Union, which annexed it from Poland in 1945. The Germans operated a forced labour camp for Jews in the town.

== Coat of arms ==
On February 23, 1792, the coat of arms was received.

The arms was mentioned in confirmation royal privilege of February 23, 1792. On the arms in a silver background it is represented the stoning of Saint Stephen. In privilege of 1792 the arms is represented in a round shield, there was a version in a baroque shield later. The arms was registered by authorities of Belarus on December 23, 1999.

== Demographics ==
Historical population
Year	Pop.	±%
1859	1,223	—
1866	1,125	−8.0%
1897	2,615	+132.4%
1921	2,459	−6.0%
1931	2,574	+4.7%
2023	6,225	+141.8%
2024	6,214	−0.2%
2025	6,149	−1.0%
2026	6,100	−0.8%
Sources:

- Nationality according to the 1921 Polish census:

Nationality	Number	percentage (%)
Jews	1,207	49.1
Poles	1,002	40.7
Belarusians	234	9.5
Other	16	0.65
Total	2,459	100.0

=== Language ===
- Language according to the Imperial census of 1897.

Language	Number	percentage (%)	males	females
Jewish	1,515	57.9	725	790
Polish	521	19.9	254	276
Belarusian	500	19.1	224	276
Russian	76	2.9	46	30
Other	3	0.1	2	1
Total	2,615	100.0	1,251	1,364
