= Ta'anit (Talmud) =

Tractate of the Mishnah

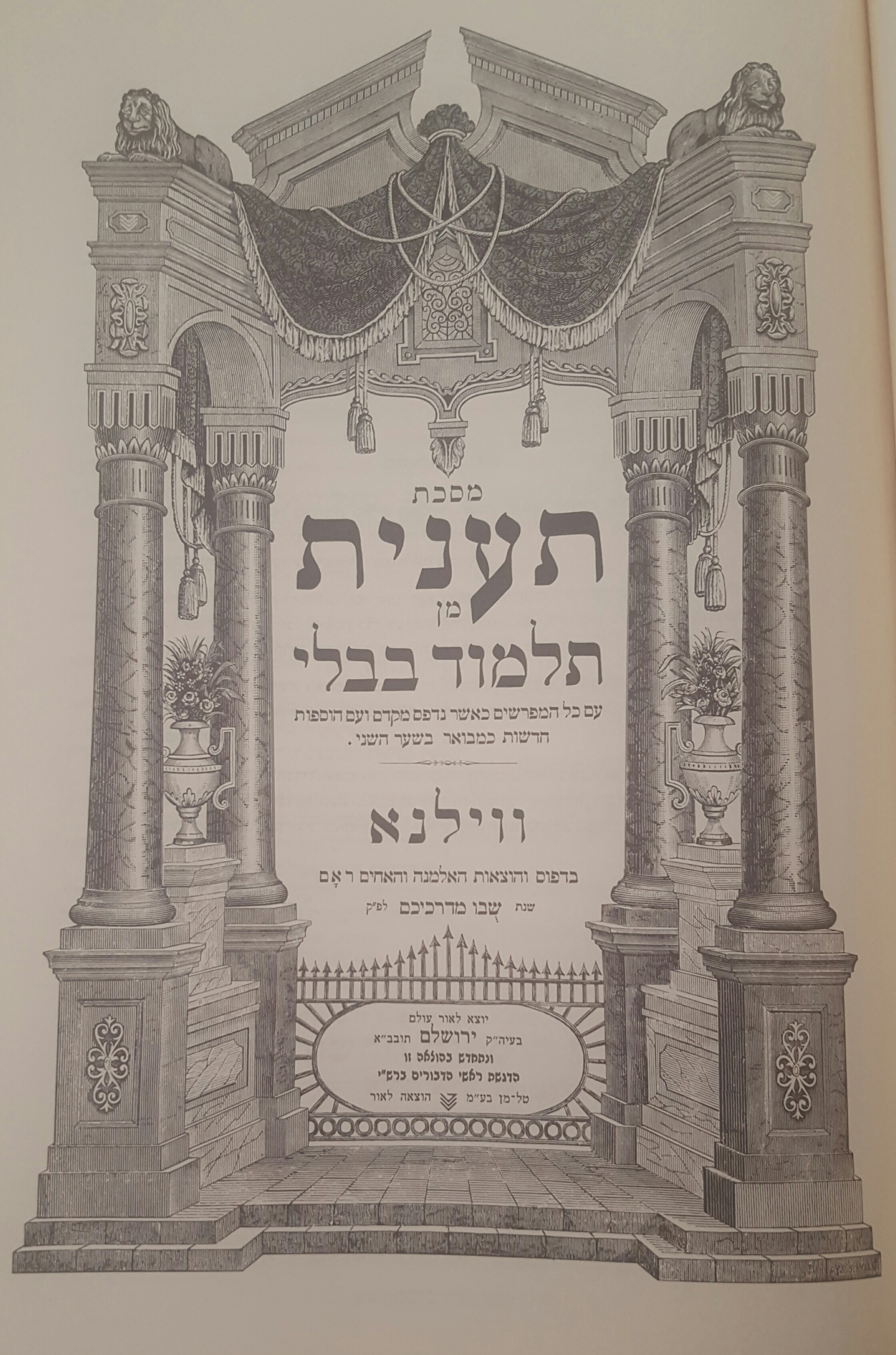
- Cover page of Masekhet Ta'anit, Vilna edition

Tractate of the Talmud
- Seder: Moed
- Number of mishnahs: 34
- Chapters: 4
- Babylonian Talmud pages: 31
- Jerusalem Talmud pages: 26
- Tosefta chapters: 3

Ta'anit or Taynis (Hebrew: תַּעֲנִית) is a volume (or "tractate") of the Mishnah, Tosefta, and both Talmuds. In Judaism these are the basic works of rabbinic literature. The tractate of Ta'anit is devoted chiefly to the fast-days, their practices and prayers. In most editions of the Talmud this treatise is the ninth in the mishnaic order of Seder Mo'ed, and is divided into four chapters containing thirty-four folio in all.

== Summary ==
The main contents of the Ta'anit are as follows:

- Chapter 1: Concerning the date on which one begin to mention rain in the second blessing of the Amidah and to pray for rain in the eighth blessing (1:1-3); the time during which one fasts on account of scarcity of rain—two successive periods of three days each, and a final one of seven days—and the distinctions between these various days concerning strictness in fasting (1:4-6); nature of the national mourning in case no rain falls despite many fast-days (1:7).
- Chapter 2: The ceremonies which must be observed in fasting (2:1); the prayers and the blowing of the trumpet in this connection (2:2-5); the participation of the priests both in the fasts of three days and in that of seven days (2:6-7); days on which public fasts are prohibited according to Megillat Taanit (2:8-10).
- Chapter 3: Cases in which the order of fasting may be changed, and the trumpet may be blown at the very beginning of the fast (3:1-3); other occasions on which a fast is held and the trumpet blown, as when a plague breaks out in a city or when an army marches against it (3:4-7); concerning Honi HaMe'agel, who prayed for rain (3:8); cases in which fasting ceases when rain begins to fall (3:9).
- Chapter 4: Days on which the priests raise their hands four times to bless the people (4:1); the institution of lay assistants ("ma'amadot") for the sacrifice, the time when they assembled, the days on which they fasted, and the sections of Scripture which they read on each day (4:2-4); the day of the month appointed for the bringing of the wood-offering (Nehemiah 10:34) during the period of the Temple (4:5); the Seventeenth of Tammuz and Tisha B'Av, and the five sad events which befell the Jewish people on each of these days (4:6-7); the festivities which marked Yom Kippur and Tu B'Av (the most important day of the wood-offering) in ancient times in Jerusalem, when the maidens, dressed in white, danced in the vineyards and called on the young men to seek worthy brides for themselves (4:8).

== Other Talmudic literature ==
The Tosefta to this treatise contains much that elucidates and supplements the Mishnah. Especially noteworthy are the account of the origin of the priestly classes (4:2), the changes which affected them after the return from exile, and how they were again subdivided (2:1).

The two Gemaras contain, in addition to the explanations of individual mishnayot, many aggadic sayings, as well as many narratives and legends. The following sayings from the Babylonian Gemara may be cited here:

- Why is learning compared to a fire? Because, as many chips burn better together than singly, so learning is promoted when it is pursued by many scholars studying in company.
- A sage who holds himself aloof from other scholars deteriorates learning.
- Hanina said he had learned much from his teachers, but more from his colleagues, and most of all from his pupils.
- Learning is like water; for as water can not remain in a high place, so learning can not be the possession of a proud and haughty man (7a).
- If a pupil finds study difficult, it is only because he has not systematically arranged the material to be learned (8a).
- If when Israel is visited with affliction a man severs fellowship with his brethren, the two angels who accompany each one come to him, lay their hands upon his head, and say: "This man would not suffer with his people; therefore he shall not behold them when they are comforted and see days of happiness" (11a).

Among the narratives particular attention should be given to the story of Nicodemus b. Gorion (19b-20a) and to the legend of Honi the Circledrawer, who slept for seventy years (23a).

Noteworthy in Talmud Yerushalmi is the account of the three scrolls of the Law which were in the Temple in Jerusalem and which differed from one another in various passages. Where two of these scrolls agreed as regards a reading, it was accepted as the correct text (4:2, 20b or 68a).

This Gemara contains also a remarkable saying of Abbahu, which is evidently directed against Christianity: "If a man says, 'I am God,' he lies; and if he says, 'I am the son of man,' he will have to repent; and if he says, 'I shall go up to heaven,' he will not do it, nor achieve what he promises" (2:1, 9a or 65b). It likewise relates how Simon bar Kokhba killed Eleazar of Modi'im, whom a Samaritan had falsely accused of treason.
