= Jehiel ben Solomon Heilprin =

Lithuanian rabbi and chronicler (c.1660–c.1746)

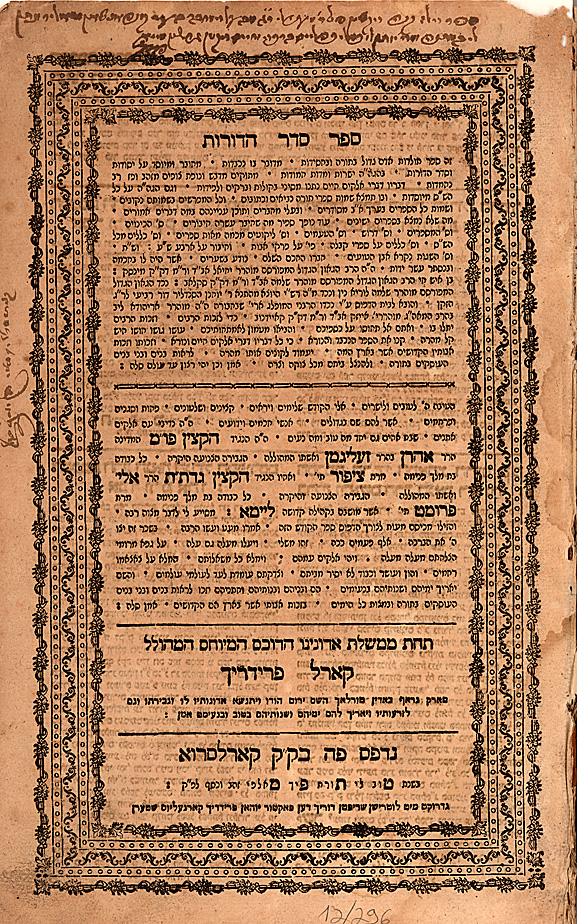
Seder ha-dorot. Karlsruhe : F.W. Lotter and M. Macklott, 1769.

Jehiel ben Solomon Heilprin (Hebrew: יחיאל היילפרין; c. 1660 – c. 1746) was a Lithuanian rabbi, kabalist, and chronicler.

== Biography ==
He was a descendant of Solomon Luria, and traced his genealogy back through Rashi to the tanna Johanan HaSandlar. He was rabbi of Hlusk, Minsk Voivodeship until 1711, when he was called to the rabbinate of Minsk, where he officiated also as head of the yeshivah until his death. Heilprin was one of the most eminent Talmudists of his time. He was opposed to casuistry, and on this account succeeded in grouping around him a great number of liberal-minded pupils. For a long time he had to sustain a hard struggle with Aryeh Leib ben Asher Gunzberg, who, while still a young man, had founded a yeshivah at Minsk, which at first was very flourishing. Aryeh Leib attacked Heilprin's method of teaching, and the antagonism between them spread to their pupils. Later, Aryeh Leib, being obliged to assist his father in the district rabbinate, neglected his yeshivah, which was ultimately closed, and Heilprin was no longer bothered.

Heilprin devoted a part of his time to the study of Kabbalah, on which subject he wrote a work. He was opposed to giving approbations to new books, deviating, as he himself says, only twice from his general principle in this regard. The two works so favored were the Ir Ḥomah of Abraham Judah Elijah and the Magen HaElef of Aryeh Löb of Plock.

== Seder HaDorot ==
Heilprin is especially known through his Seder HaDorot. This work consists of three independent volumes or parts:

- The first of these, entitled Yemot Olam, is a history from the Creation down to his own time. The author always endeavors to give, by means of calculation, the dates of Biblical personages. He bases his work on the Yuḥasin of Abraham Zacuto, on the Shalshelet HaKabbalah of Gedaliah ibn Yaḥya, and on the Ẓemaḥ Dawid of David Gans. It seems that this first part was written when the author was still young, for the last event which he registered was one occurring in 1697.
- The second part, Seder HaTanna'im VehaAmoraim, contains lists of the Tannaim and Amoraim in alphabetical order with their dates.
- The third part is a kind of catalogue containing first the names of all the authors, then those of their works, both arranged in alphabetical order. Heilprin based this part on the Sifte Yeshenim of Shabbethai Bass, but added a great number of other titles. He states in the preface the many advantages of a knowledge of the chronological order of the Talmudists, which indeed in certain cases is absolutely necessary.

The whole work is followed by notes on the Talmud, also arranged in alphabetical order. It was published for the first time by Heilprin's grandson, Judah Löb Heilprin, at Carlsruhe in 1769. There exist several other editions, the latest (as of 1906) being the revised one of Naphtali Maskileison, son of Abraham Maskileison, Warsaw, 1882.

Of Heilprin's numerous other works mentioned in the Seder HaDorot, the only one which has been published is Erke HaKinnuyim, a dictionary of synonyms and homonyms occurring in the Bible, Talmud, and other works, chiefly kabbalistic (Dyhernfurth, 1806).

He cites Judah Halevi, Meir Aldabi, and Abraham Bibago to claim that Aristotle learned from the books of Solomon when Alexander the Great conquered Jerusalem. He also states that Aristotle converted to Judaism late in life and disavowed his Metaphysics.
