= Psalm 128 =

Jewish hymn

- "Blessed is every one that feareth the LORD"
- Song of Ascents
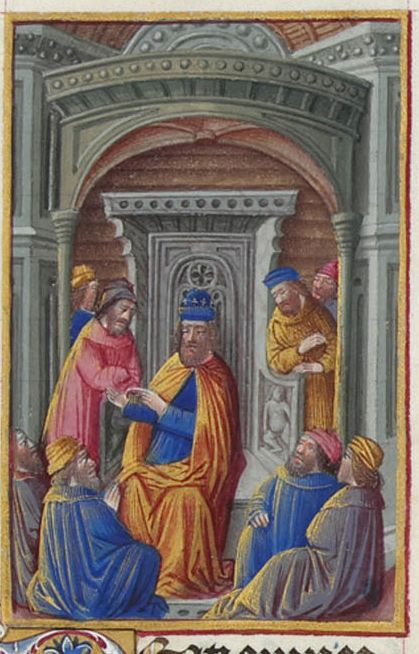
- Miniature illustrating Psalm 128, Blessing on the Faithful, in The Very Rich Hours of the Duke of Berry
- Other name: Psalm 127 (Vulgate); "Beati omnes"
- Language: Hebrew (original)

Psalm 128
- ← Psalm 127 Psalm 129 →
- Book: Book of Psalms
- Hebrew Bible part: Ketuvim
- Order in the Hebrew part: 1
- Category: Sifrei Emet
- Christian Bible part: Old Testament
- Order in the Christian part: 19

Psalm 128 is the 128th psalm of the Book of Psalms, beginning in English in the King James Version: "Blessed is every one that feareth the LORD; that walketh in his ways". In the slightly different numbering system used in the Greek Septuagint and the Latin Vulgate, this psalm is Psalm 127. In Latin, it is known as "Beati omnes qui timent Dominum".

The psalm forms a regular part of Jewish, Catholic, Lutheran, Anglican and other Protestant liturgies.

== Theme ==
Written anonymously, Psalm 128 likely dates to the post-exilic period (that is, after about 539 BCE).

The Jamieson-Fausset-Brown Bible Commentary describes Zechariah 8:1–8 as a "virtual commentary on this psalm".

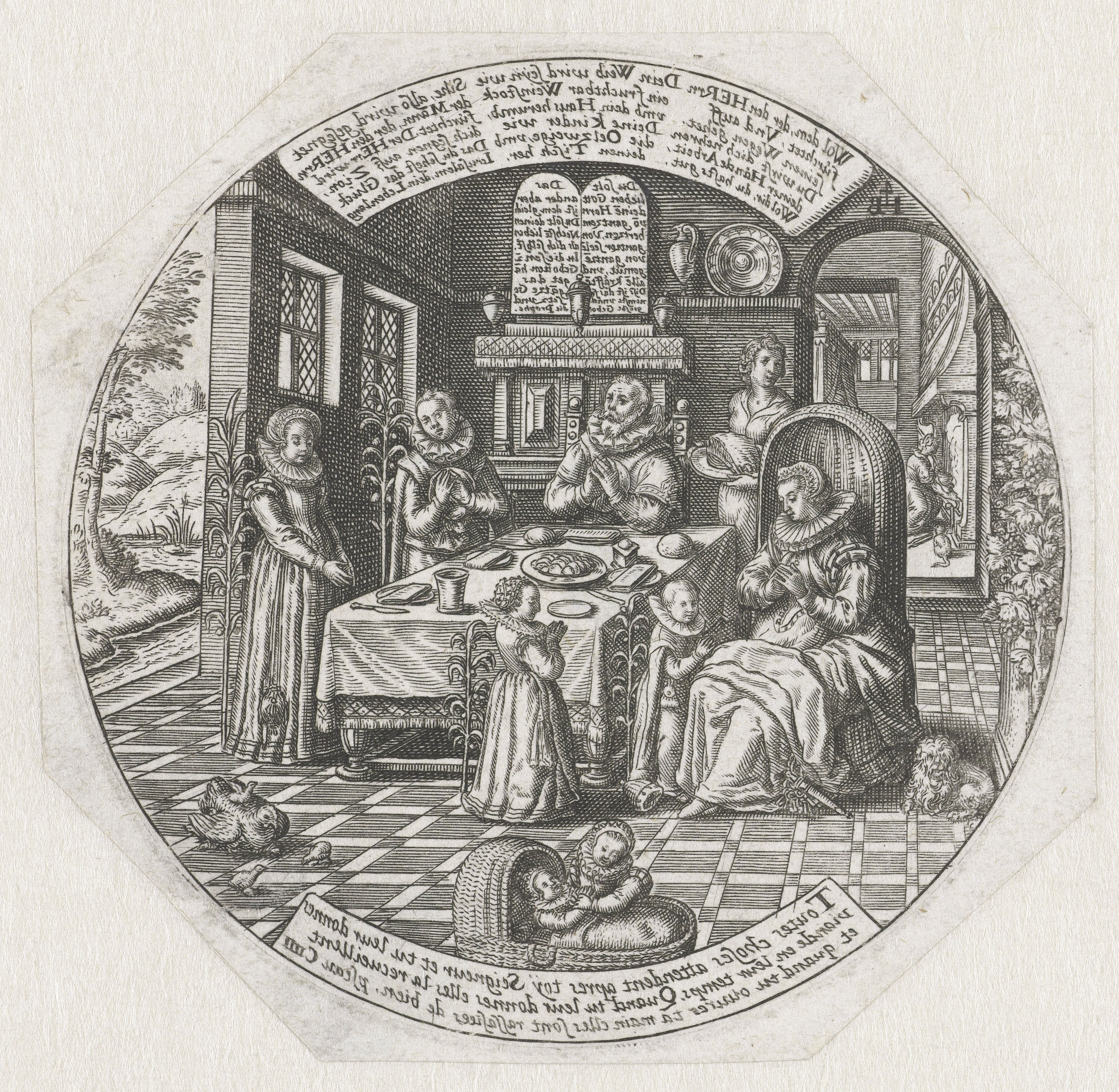
Gebed voor de maaltijd (Dutch): A prosperous family in a praying position around a set table in a room. The parents sit, the children stand. Behind them are depicted olive sprouts. The theme of the mealtime prayer was related to Psalm 128, which likens children to olive sprouts. The fertile vine, a symbol for the housewife, is visualized on the left against the wall, behind the mother's chair. In the foreground is a small child kneeling at a baby's cradle.

== Uses ==
=== Judaism ===
This psalm is recited in some communities following Mincha between Sukkot and Shabbat Hagadol. It is also recited in many communities prior to Aleinu during Motzei Shabbat Maariv (in other communities following havdalah, see Veyiten Lecha), and among the prayers of the Bedtime Shema. Its second verse is found in Pirkei Avot Chapter 4, no. 1. and Chapter 6, no. 4.

=== Catholic Church ===
Traditionally, since the Middle Ages, this psalm has been recited within the Office of none from Tuesday until Saturday, according to the Rule of St. Benedict (530).

In the liturgy of the current Roman Rite Mass, Psalm 128 is used on the feast of the Holy Family, the 33rd Sunday in Ordinary Time of the year A and the 27th Sunday in Ordinary Time of the year B. It is also the traditional psalm for nuptial masses (missa pro votiva sponso and sponsa).

In the Sarum Use, the psalm was also sung by the priest after Psalm 121 at the churching of women.

=== Coptic Orthodox Church ===
In the Agpeya, the Coptic Church's book of hours, this psalm is prayed in the office of Vespers and the second watch of the Midnight office.

=== Musical settings ===
Heinrich Schütz composed a metred paraphrase of Psalm 128 in German, "Ich heb mein Augen auf zu dir", SWV 233, for the Becker Psalter, published first in 1628.

This psalm was used by Michel-Richard Delalande in 1698 to compose a grand motet (S51) which was played in the royal chapel of Versailles to celebrate the offices. Henry Desmarest composed a grand motet "Beati omnes" (unknown date). Marc-Antoine Charpentier composed in 1680/1681 one "Beati omnes qui timent Dominum" H.178, for 3 voices, 2 treble instruments and continuo.

Salamone Rossi, the 17th-century Jewish-Italian composer who was the first known composer to write choral music for the Jewish liturgy, published three settings of the psalm (for 3, 5, and 6 voices) in his collection Shir Ha'shirim Lishlomo, published in 1622.

== Text ==
The following table shows the Hebrew text of the Psalm with vowels, alongside the Koine Greek text in the Septuagint and the English translation from the King James Version. Note that the meaning can slightly differ between these versions, as the Septuagint and the Masoretic Text come from different textual traditions. (Note: A 1917 translation directly from Hebrew to English by the Jewish Publication Society can be found here or here, and an 1844 translation directly from the Septuagint by L. C. L. Brenton can be found here. Both translations are in the public domain.) In the Septuagint, this psalm is numbered Psalm 127.

#	Hebrew	English	Greek
1	שִׁ֗יר הַֽמַּ֫עֲל֥וֹת אַ֭שְׁרֵי כׇּל־יְרֵ֣א יְהֹוָ֑ה הַ֝הֹלֵ֗ךְ בִּדְרָכָֽיו׃	(A Song of degrees.) Blessed is every one that feareth the LORD; that walketh in his ways.	᾿ῼδὴ τῶν ἀναβαθμῶν. - ΜΑΚΑΡΙΟΙ πάντες οἱ φοβούμενοι τὸν Κύριον, οἱ πορευόμενοι ἐν ταῖς ὁδοῖς αὐτοῦ.
2	יְגִ֣יעַ כַּ֭פֶּיךָ כִּ֣י תֹאכֵ֑ל אַ֝שְׁרֶ֗יךָ וְט֣וֹב לָֽךְ׃	For thou shalt eat the labour of thine hands: happy shalt thou be, and it shall be well with thee.	τοὺς πόνους τῶν καρπῶν σου φάγεσαι· μακάριος εἶ, καὶ καλῶς σοι ἔσται.
3	אֶשְׁתְּךָ֤ ׀ כְּגֶ֥פֶן פֹּרִיָּה֮ בְּיַרְכְּתֵ֢י בֵ֫יתֶ֥ךָ בָּ֭נֶיךָ כִּשְׁתִלֵ֣י זֵיתִ֑ים סָ֝בִ֗יב לְשֻׁלְחָנֶֽךָ׃	Thy wife shall be as a fruitful vine by the sides of thine house: thy children like olive plants round about thy table.	ἡ γυνή σου ὡς ἄμπελος εὐθηνοῦσα ἐν τοῖς κλίτεσι τῆς οἰκίας σου· οἱ υἱοί σου ὡς νεόφυτα ἐλαιῶν κύκλῳ τῆς τραπέζης σου.
4	הִנֵּ֣ה כִי־כֵ֭ן יְבֹ֥רַךְ גָּ֗בֶר יְרֵ֣א יְהֹוָֽה׃	Behold, that thus shall the man be blessed that feareth the LORD.	ἰδοὺ οὕτως εὐλογηθήσεται ἄνθρωπος ὁ φοβούμενος τὸν Κύριον.
5	יְבָרֶכְךָ֥ יְהֹוָ֗ה מִצִּ֫יּ֥וֹן וּ֭רְאֵה בְּט֣וּב יְרוּשָׁלָ֑͏ִם כֹּ֝֗ל יְמֵ֣י חַיֶּֽיךָ׃	The LORD shall bless thee out of Zion: and thou shalt see the good of Jerusalem all the days of thy life.	εὐλογήσαι σε Κύριος ἐκ Σιών, καὶ ἴδοις τὰ ἀγαθὰ ῾Ιερουσαλὴμ πάσας τὰς ἡμέρας τῆς ζωῆς σου·
6	וּרְאֵֽה־בָנִ֥ים לְבָנֶ֑יךָ שָׁ֝ל֗וֹם עַל־יִשְׂרָאֵֽל׃	Yea, thou shalt see thy children's children, and peace upon Israel.	καὶ ἴδοις υἱοὺς τῶν υἱῶν σου. εἰρήνη ἐπὶ τὸν ᾿Ισραήλ.

=== Verse 6 ===
May you see your children’s children! Peace be upon Israel!

This verse recalls Jacob's reunion with his son Joseph in Genesis 48:11: And Israel [Jacob] said to Joseph, "I had not thought to see your face; but in fact, God has also shown me your offspring!" and is reflected in Job's restoration: After this Job lived one hundred and forty years, and saw his children and grandchildren for four generations. Proverbs 17:6 celebrates the same idea: Children’s children are the crown of old men.

The concluding prayer for peace upon Israel, which also appears in Psalm 125, is best taken as a "detached clause", according to the Pulpit Commentary.
