= Psalm 30 =

Biblical psalm

- "I will extol thee, O LORD; for thou hast lifted me up"
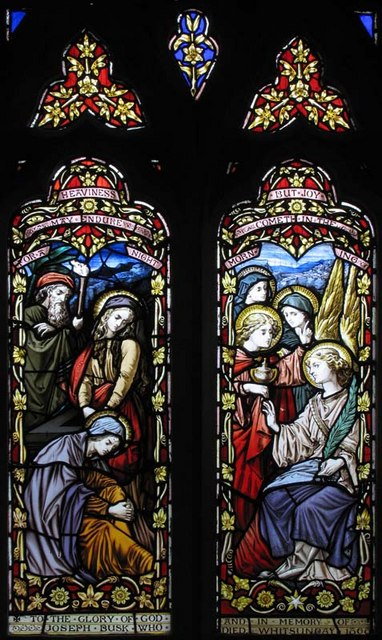
- Text from Psalm 30:5, "Heaviness may endure for a night, but joy cometh in the morning", illustrated on a window in St Giles, Codicote, Hertfordshire, UK
- Other name: Psalm 29; "Exaltabo te Domine"
- Text: by David
- Language: Hebrew (original)

Psalm 30
- ← Psalm 29 Psalm 31 →
- Book: Book of Psalms
- Hebrew Bible part: Ketuvim
- Order in the Hebrew part: 1
- Category: Sifrei Emet
- Christian Bible part: Old Testament
- Order in the Christian part: 19

Psalm 30 is the 30th psalm of the Book of Psalms, beginning in English in the King James Version: "I will extol thee, O LORD; for thou hast lifted me up". The Book of Psalms is part of the third section of the Hebrew Bible and a book of the Christian Old Testament. In the slightly different numbering system used in the Greek Septuagint version of the Bible and in the Latin Vulgate, this psalm is Psalm 29. In Latin, it is known as "Exaltabo te Domine". It is a psalm of thanksgiving, traditionally ascribed to David upon the building of his own royal palace.

The psalm is a regular part of Jewish, Catholic, Lutheran, Anglican and other Protestant liturgies. It has inspired hymns been set to music.

== Theme ==
Psalm 30 is called Hebrew: מזמר שיר חנכת הבית, Mizmor Shir Ḥănukkāt HaBayit, "A Psalm, a song for the Dedication of a House" Greek numbering: Psalm 29). It is a psalm of thanksgiving, traditionally ascribed to David upon the building of his own royal palace. David dedicated his life work to be completed by his son, who built the "Hallowed House", Beit HaMiqdash Hebrew: בית המקדש Solomon's Temple. It is Solomon and his lineage, not the building, which in later sources are called the House of David.

חינוך Chinuch, from the same root as Hanukkah, is the name for Jewish education, emphasizing ethical training and discipline.

== Liturgical use in Judaism ==
- This psalm is a part of daily prayer in some rites. It was originally recited in Pesukei dezimra, a section of the Shacharit prayer, in the Sephardic rite, in which they omit the first verse. From there, it seems to have made its way in the 17th century to Nusach Sefard, in which they added the first verse, and from there it was adopted in the Eastern Ashkenazic rite. It is not recited in the Western Ashkenazic rite, the Italian rite or the Yemenite rite. The purpose of this was to dedicate the morning temple service.
- Psalm 30 is also considered the psalm for the day of Hanukkah, and some communities recite it in addition to, or instead of, the regular Psalm of the day.
  - There are many traditional and contemporary melodies for this psalm that are sung or recited especially during Hanukkah.
  - Psalm 30 in Vizhnitz melody, by Invitation to Piyut
  - Psalm 30 by R. Avner Yemini and congregation
- Verse 12 is found in the version of Veyiten Lecha recited at Maariv of Motzei Shabbat in the Eastern Ashkenazic rite; it is among the verses omitted in the Western Ashkenazic rite.
- Verse 13 is part of Uva Letzion.

== Christian uses ==
Augustine saw the psalm David wrote of the founding of the house as pointing to the resurrection of Christ and the foundation of God's house, the church.

In the Catholic Church, Psalm 30 is appointed to be read at Lauds (Morning Prayer) on Thursday in the first week of the month.

In the Agpeya, the Coptic Church's book of hours, this psalm is prayed in the office of Terce. It is also in the prayer of the Veil, which is generally prayed only by monks.

In the Church of England's Book of Common Prayer, this psalm is appointed to be read on the morning of the sixth day of the month.

Verse 5 is used in the Jesus Culture song "Your Love Never Fails".

== Musical settings ==
Heinrich Schütz wrote a setting of a metric paraphrase of Psalm 30 in German, "Ich preis dich, Herr, zu aller Stund", SWV 127, for the Becker Psalter, published first in 1628.

== Text ==
The following table shows the Hebrew text of the Psalm with vowels, alongside the Koine Greek text in the Septuagint and the English translation from the King James Version. Note that the meaning can slightly differ between these versions, as the Septuagint and the Masoretic Text come from different textual traditions. (Note: A 1917 translation directly from Hebrew to English by the Jewish Publication Society can be found here or here, and an 1844 translation directly from the Septuagint by L. C. L. Brenton can be found here. Both translations are in the public domain.) In the Septuagint, this psalm is numbered Psalm 29.

#	Hebrew	English	Greek
(Note: In the Jewish verse numbering, the ascription of this psalm is verse 1, and the rest of the psalm begins from verse 2. However, the Christian verse numbering does not count the ascription as a separate verse.)	מִזְמ֡וֹר שִׁיר־חֲנֻכַּ֖ת הַבַּ֣יִת לְדָוִֽד׃	(A Psalm and Song at the dedication of the house of David.)	Εἰς τὸ τέλος· ψαλμὸς ᾠδῆς τοῦ ἐγκαινισμοῦ τοῦ οἴκου· Δαυΐδ. -
1	אֲרוֹמִמְךָ֣ יְ֭הֹוָה כִּ֣י דִלִּיתָ֑נִי וְלֹֽא־שִׂמַּ֖חְתָּ אֹיְבַ֣י לִֽי׃	I will extol thee, O LORD; for thou hast lifted me up, and hast not made my foes to rejoice over me.	ΥΨΩΣΩ σε, Κύριε, ὅτι ὑπέλαβές με καὶ οὐκ εὔφρανας τοὺς ἐχθρούς μου ἐπ᾿ ἐμέ.
2	יְהֹוָ֥ה אֱלֹהָ֑י שִׁוַּ֥עְתִּי אֵ֝לֶ֗יךָ וַתִּרְפָּאֵֽנִי׃	O LORD my God, I cried unto thee, and thou hast healed me.	Κύριε ὁ Θεός μου, ἐκέκραξα πρὸς σέ, καὶ ἰάσω με·
3	יְֽהֹוָ֗ה הֶעֱלִ֣יתָ מִן־שְׁא֣וֹל נַפְשִׁ֑י חִ֝יִּיתַ֗נִי (מיורדי) [מִיׇּֽרְדִי־]בֽוֹר׃	O LORD, thou hast brought up my soul from the grave: thou hast kept me alive, that I should not go down to the pit.	Κύριε, ἀνήγαγες ἐξ ᾅδου τὴν ψυχήν μου, ἔσωσάς με ἀπὸ τῶν καταβαινόντων εἰς λάκκον.
4	זַמְּר֣וּ לַיהֹוָ֣ה חֲסִידָ֑יו וְ֝הוֹד֗וּ לְזֵ֣כֶר קׇדְשֽׁוֹ׃	Sing unto the LORD, O ye saints of his, and give thanks at the remembrance of his holiness.	ψάλατε τῷ Κυρίῳ, οἱ ὅσιοι αὐτοῦ, καὶ ἐξομολογεῖσθε τῇ μνήμῃ τῆς ἁγιωσύνης αὐτοῦ·
5	כִּ֤י רֶ֨גַע ׀ בְּאַפּוֹ֮ חַיִּ֢ים בִּרְצ֫וֹנ֥וֹ בָּ֭עֶרֶב יָלִ֥ין בֶּ֗כִי וְלַבֹּ֥קֶר רִנָּֽה׃	For his anger endureth but a moment; in his favour is life: weeping may endure for a night, but joy cometh in the morning.	ὅτι ὀργὴ ἐν τῷ θυμῷ αὐτοῦ, καὶ ζωὴ ἐν τῷ θελήματι αὐτοῦ· τὸ ἑσπέρας αὐλισθήσεται κλαυθμὸς καὶ εἰς τὸ πρωΐ ἀγαλλίασις.
6	וַ֭אֲנִי אָמַ֣רְתִּי בְשַׁלְוִ֑י בַּל־אֶמּ֥וֹט לְעוֹלָֽם׃	And in my prosperity I said, I shall never be moved.	ἐγὼ δὲ εἶπα ἐν τῇ εὐθηνίᾳ μου· οὐ μὴ σαλευθῶ εἰς τὸν αἰῶνα.
7	יְֽהֹוָ֗ה בִּרְצוֹנְךָ֮ הֶעֱמַ֢דְתָּה לְֽהַרְרִ֫י־עֹ֥ז הִסְתַּ֥רְתָּ פָנֶ֗יךָ הָיִ֥יתִי נִבְהָֽל׃	LORD, by thy favour thou hast made my mountain to stand strong: thou didst hide thy face, and I was troubled.	Κύριε, ἐν τῷ θελήματί σου παρέσχου τῷ κάλλει μου δύναμιν· ἀπέστρεψας δὲ τὸ πρόσωπόν σου καὶ ἐγενήθην τεταραγμένος.
8	אֵלֶ֣יךָ יְהֹוָ֣ה אֶקְרָ֑א וְאֶל־אֲ֝דֹנָ֗י אֶתְחַנָּֽן׃	I cried to thee, O LORD; and unto the LORD I made supplication.	πρὸς σέ, Κύριε, κεκράξομαι, καὶ πρὸς τὸν Θεόν μου δεηθήσομαι.
9	מַה־בֶּ֥צַע בְּדָמִי֮ בְּרִדְתִּ֢י אֶ֫ל־שָׁ֥חַת הֲיוֹדְךָ֥ עָפָ֑ר הֲיַגִּ֥יד אֲמִתֶּֽךָ׃	What profit is there in my blood, when I go down to the pit? Shall the dust praise thee? shall it declare thy truth?	τίς ὠφέλεια ἐν τῷ αἵματί μου ἐν τῷ καταβαίνειν με εἰς διαφθοράν; μὴ ἐξομολογήσεταί σοι χοῦς ἢ ἀναγγελεῖ τὴν ἀλήθειάν σου;
10	שְׁמַע־יְהֹוָ֥ה וְחׇנֵּ֑נִי יְ֝הֹוָ֗ה הֱֽיֵה־עֹזֵ֥ר לִֽי׃	Hear, O LORD, and have mercy upon me: LORD, be thou my helper.	ἤκουσε Κύριος, καὶ ἠλέησέ με, Κύριος ἐγενήθη βοηθός μου.
11	הָפַ֣כְתָּ מִסְפְּדִי֮ לְמָח֢וֹל לִ֥֫י פִּתַּ֥חְתָּ שַׂקִּ֑י וַֽתְּאַזְּרֵ֥נִי שִׂמְחָֽה׃	Thou hast turned for me my mourning into dancing: thou hast put off my sackcloth, and girded me with gladness;	ἔστρεψας τὸν κοπετόν μου εἰς χαρὰν ἐμοί, διέῤῥηξας τὸν σάκκον μου καὶ περιέζωσάς με εὐφροσύνην,
12	לְמַ֤עַן ׀ יְזַמֶּרְךָ֣ כָ֭בוֹד וְלֹ֣א יִדֹּ֑ם יְהֹוָ֥ה אֱ֝לֹהַ֗י לְעוֹלָ֥ם אוֹדֶֽךָּ׃	To the end that my glory may sing praise to thee, and not be silent. O LORD my God, I will give thanks unto thee for ever.	ὅπως ἂν ψάλῃ σοι ἡ δόξα μου καὶ οὐ μὴ κατανυγῶ. Κύριε ὁ Θεός μου, εἰς τὸν αἰῶνα ἐξομολογήσομαί σοι.
