= Magen Avot =

Magen Avot may refer to:

- The central paragraph of the Seven-Faceted Blessing, in Jewish liturgy
  - Magen Avot (piyyut), inserted into that blessing
- The title of various books
  - The responsa of Menahem Ha-me'iri
  - The anti-Christian polemic by Simeon ben Zemah Duran
- Maghain Aboth Synagogue, in Singapore

== See also ==
- Avot (disambiguation)
