= Veyiten Lecha =

Veyiten Lecha (Hebrew: ויתן לך) is a collection of Biblical verses recited as a prayer recited on Saturday night (Motzei Shabbat), immediately after the evening prayer (Maariv) or after Havdalah. It consists of a collection of blessing and success verses, and is recited to begin the new week with good fortune. This custom is mentioned in the books Kol Bo and Abudraham. Rabbi Abraham ben Nathan in his book "HaManhig" says: "It is the custom of all Israel to say 'Veyiten Lecha' and all the verses of blessings, so that they will be blessed in the coming Sabbath (next week), from now and forever."

== Prayer Order ==
There are several versions of the prayer (see customs section below). The most well-known is the Eastern Ashkenazi version, which is described here. The prayer begins with Isaac's blessing to Jacob: "May God give you of the dew of heaven and the fat of the earth, and plenty of grain and wine."

This is followed by Jacob's blessing to Manasseh and Ephraim: "The Angel who has redeemed me from all evil, bless the lads; and let my name be named upon them, and the name of my fathers Abraham and Isaac; and let them grow into a multitude in the midst of the earth."

Then comes Moses' blessing to the Children of Israel from the beginning of Deuteronomy: "The Lord your God has multiplied you, and behold, you are today as numerous as the stars of heaven. May the Lord, God of your fathers, add to you a thousand times more than you are, and bless you as He has promised you."

The prayer includes verses from the blessings in Parshat Ki Tavo: "Blessed shall you be in the city, and blessed shall you be in the field. Blessed shall be the fruit of your body, and the fruit of your ground, and the fruit of your cattle, the increase of your cattle, and the flocks of your sheep," etc.

The blessing verse for those who fulfill the commandment of debt release: "And you shall lend to many nations, but you shall not borrow; and you shall rule over many nations, but they shall not rule over you."

The concluding verse from Moses' blessing to the Children of Israel in Parshat V'Zot HaBeracha: "Happy are you, O Israel! Who is like you, a people saved by the Lord, the shield of your help, and the sword of your excellency! Your enemies shall submit themselves to you, and you shall tread upon their high places."

Following this are selected verses from Prophets and Writings, including among other verses, three "reversals" (verses dealing with turning mourning into joy), three "redemptions" (verses dealing with redemption from trouble), and three "peaces" (verses dealing with peace). The combination of these verses in the prayer follows the recommendation of Rav Huna bar Ami in the name of Rabbi Pedat in the name of Rabbi Yochanan, who says regarding improving a dream: "Rav Huna bar Ami said in the name of Rabbi Pedat who said in the name of Rabbi Yochanan: One who sees a dream and his soul is distressed... should improve it before three people. He should bring three people and say to them 'I saw a good dream,' and they should say to him 'It is good and may it be good; may the Merciful One make it good. Seven times may it be decreed from Heaven that it be good and may it be good.' And they should recite three reversals, three redemptions, and three peaces..."

The prayer concludes with Rabbi Yochanan's aggadah from Tractate Megillah: "Rabbi Yochanan said: Wherever you find the mighty power of the Holy One, blessed be He, you find His humility. This matter is written in the Torah, repeated in the Prophets, and stated a third time in the Writings. Written in the Torah: 'For the Lord your God is God of gods and Lord of lords,' and it is written afterward 'He executes justice for the orphan and widow.' Repeated in the Prophets: 'Thus says the High and Lofty One who inhabits eternity, whose name is Holy,' and it is written afterward 'Yet with the contrite and humble of spirit.' Stated a third time in the Writings, as it is written: 'Extol Him who rides upon the heavens by His name,' and it is written afterward 'A father of the fatherless and a judge of widows.'"

Rabbi Seligman Baer in his 'Avodat Yisrael' Siddur explains the reasons for including Rabbi Yochanan's aggadah in the "Veyiten Lecha" prayer:

1. "To strengthen our hope in God, so we shouldn't say 'how can we raise our faces to make our requests from Him who is High and Exalted,' for He desires the prayer of the humble in spirit and the contrite heart, and He will fulfill their requests."
2. "To awaken us to conduct ourselves properly in business during the workdays and not deviate from the path of righteousness, for the Holy One, blessed be He, is a father to orphans and a judge of widows, executing justice for the oppressed."

== Customs ==
The above-mentioned version recited in the Eastern Ashkenazic rite is quite lengthy; the Western Ashkenazic rite recites a smaller selection of verses. The Italian rite recites yet a different selection of verses. and the Romaniote rite had yet a different order.

While some recite it at the end of maariv before Aleinu, others postpone its recitation until after Havdalah at home.
