= Seven Blessings =

Seven blessings may refer to:

- Seven Blessings (film), a 2023 Israeli comedy-drama film directed by Ayelet Menahemi
- Sheva Brachot, series of blessings recited at traditional Jewish weddings
- Seven-Faceted Blessing, a blessing recited in the Jewish liturgy of Friday evenings, related to the Amida
