= Call to prayer (disambiguation) =

Examples of a call to prayer may be:

- Adhan, the Islamic call to prayer
- Barechu, the Jewish call to prayer
- Church bells, the call to Christian prayer
