= Lel Shimurim Oto El Hatzah =

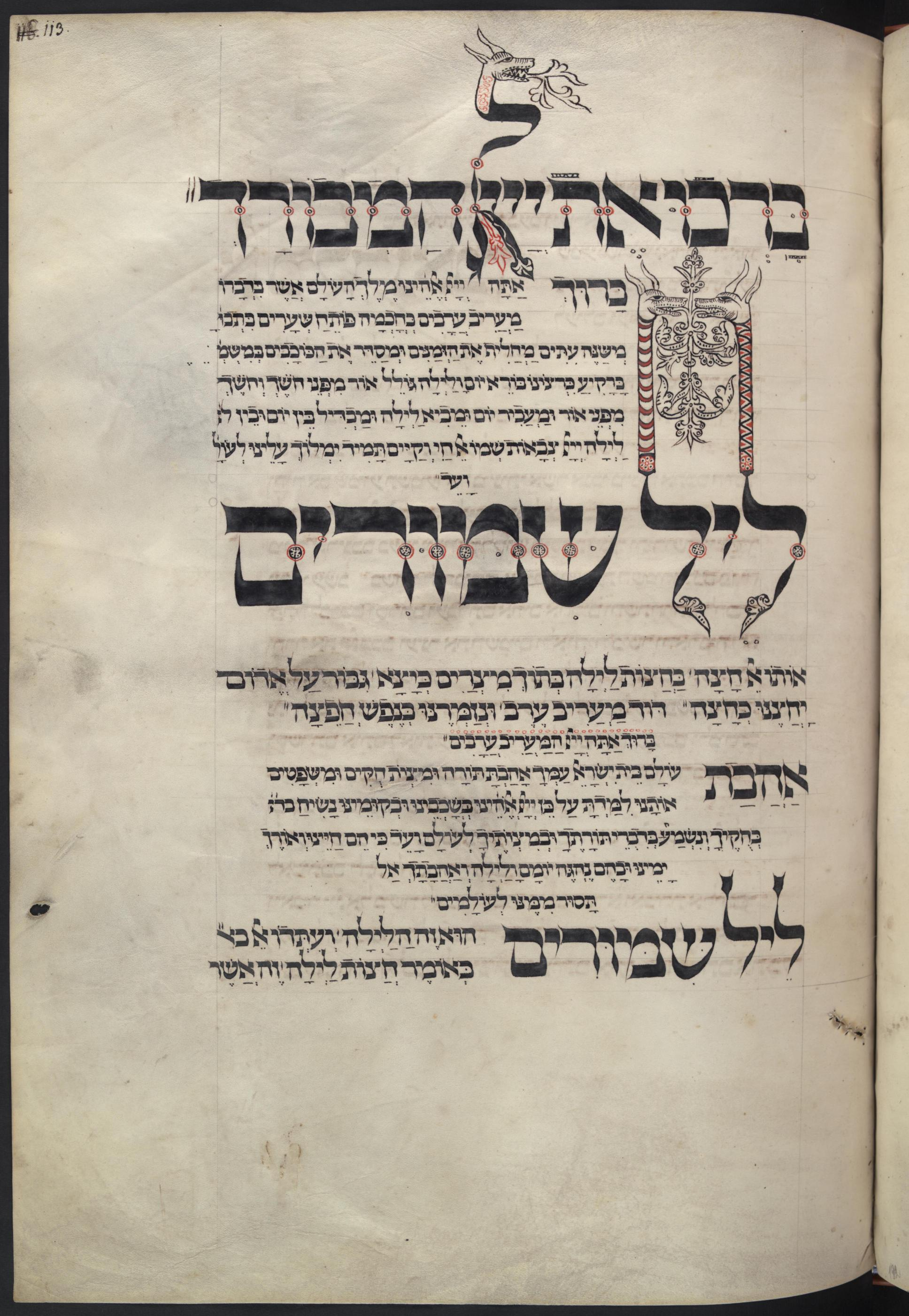
The beginning of the piyyut from MS Dresden, a 13th-century manuscript

Lel Shimurim Oto El Hatzah (Hebrew: ליל שמורים אותו אל חצה, literally 'The Night of Protection which God Split in Half') is a Maariv piyyut for the Maariv service on the first night of Passover (the seder night) of unknown authorship, which originated in the classical period of piyyut (6th-8th century). This piyyut was accepted in all the communities of Ashkenaz and Poland, France, Italy, Romania, Algeria, and also in the rites of Provence and Catalonia.

== Alternative Zulat ==
In the Ashkenazic rite (as well as the Provençal and Catalonian rites), the original Zulat (the piyyut before Mi Khamokhah), which continues the acrostic from the previous section, is missing, and instead there is an alternate Zulat which interrupts the alphabetic order. The alternate piyyut is longer, and it has its own independent alphabetic acrostic. Its theme is a comparison between the Exodus from Egypt and the future redemption, and it has alternating refrains: "In the days of the Passover festival" and "As in the days of the Passover festival." The original text is preserved in genizah fragments, and in the Italian and Romaniote rites.

== Bikkur ==
The beginning of the piyyut "Lel Shimurim" from a Passover machzor according to the Western Ashkenazic rite, published by Wolf Heidenheim in Rödelheim (1832), page 9, with the Bikkur "Ezkerah" added by Rabbi Meir shaliach tzibbur, incorporated within the set prayers. Click on the image to browse the book starting from page 24.

In the Western Ashkenaz rite, before the conclusion of Hashkiveinu, there is an additional bikkur by Rabbi Meir sheliach tzibbur Ezkerah Shenot 'Olamim ("I will remember the years of the past"), discussing the Passover sacrifice. In the other rites, this bikkur does not appear.

== English translations ==
The piyyut has been translated several times, including Jenny Marmorstein's translation of the Rödelheim machzor. It also appears with an English translation in the Artscroll Passover machzor.

== Mentions ==
The piyyut is quoted in several early rabbinic works. For example, Sefer Ha-manhig, Laws of Passover says that 'There are those who say that Rav would not eat on the day of before Passover because Rav was a firstborn. And this is because God 'killed the firstborn of Ham (Egypt) and upon his firstborn son had mercy'. The phrase 'killed the firstborn of Ham (Egypt) and upon his firstborn son had mercy' is a direct quote from the alternate zulat recited in Ashkenazic communities.

== Musical Performances ==
- Jacob Koussevitzky, the final section of the piyyut.
- Trio Lorend, the first section of the piyyut.
- The alternative (Ashkenazic) zulat was set to music in the 19th century by Samuel Naumbourg (Naumbourg claims it is based on a traditional melody, but his setting is very ornate and it is hard to believe it preserves much of the traditional melody), but it apparently has never been recorded, and it is found in S. Naoumbourg, Chants liturgiques des grandes fêtes, 2ème Partie (1847), page 126.
