= Avot =

Avot may refer to:

- Pirkei Avot, a tractate of the Mishna composed of ethical maxims of the Rabbis of the Mishnaic period
- Patriarchs (Bible), Abraham, Isaac, and Jacob
- Avot, Côte-d'Or, a commune in France
- Neve Avot, a hospital in Israel

== See also ==
- Magen Avot (disambiguation)
