= Magen Avot (piyyut) =

Magen Avot ('Shield of the ancestors') is a genre of piyyut (liturgical verse) in Rabbinic Judaism designed to be inserted into the Seven-Faceted Blessing in the Maariv service on Shabbat, right before the words Magen avot bidevaro "He shielded the ancestors with his word", from which the name of the genre is taken.

== High medieval Europe ==
This genre, unlike most genres of piyyut, does not go back to Roman Palestine, but rather to the High Middle Ages of Southwestern Europe. The first known author to write a poem in this genre was Joseph Kimhi, who was born in the Umayyad state of Córdoba, but later fled the Almohad invasion and spent his later life in Narbonne (now France) as one of the Hachmei Provence.

Kimhi wrote two piyyutim to embellish this prayer: the first one, “Yom Shabbat Zakhor” (יום שבת זכור), is intended to be recited before the beginning of the standard liturgical paragraph “Magen Avot”, and every line ends in the syllable "-hu", to rhyme with the end of the first sentence of “Magen Avot” (ha-’el ha-qadosh she-’en kamohu); the second one, “Yom Shabbat Shamor”, is intended to be recited before the second line of the standard paragraph ("He gives rest to His people on His holy Sabbath day, for He desired them, to give rest to them"), and every line ends in the syllables "-lehem", to rhyme with the end of that second line in the standard paragraph, (ki vam raṣa le-haniaḥ lahem).

These two poems of Joseph Kimhi had very different fates; “Yom Shabbat Zakhor” became quite popular, and appears in a number of manuscripts; the first two lines even made it into printed rites, and are recited even today in some synagogues of the Western Nusach Ashkenaz on the evening of a Shavuot that falls on Shabbat.

Though Joseph Kimhi was in Provence, the genre really became popular only in Germany. In the late 13th century, Samuel Devlin of Erfurt wrote a Magen Avot poem “Shipperam Ram Be-ruḥo” (שפרם רם ברוחו), following the style of “Yom Shabbat Zakhor”, and intended to be inserted in the same place in the liturgy. Like Kimhi's poems, this one is about the Sabbath in general. Later German poets wrote piyyutim of this general type specifically for special Shabbats, and those that fell on holidays; these poems speak not only about Shabbat, but also about the specific themes of the given holiday. The twentieth-century scholar Ezra Fleischer collected, from Ashkenazic manuscripts, no fewer than eighteen such poems, by various poets, for occasions throughout the year, such as: a Shabbat that falls on Rosh Ḥodesh, or Hanukkah, or Rosh Hashana, or Shabbat Nachamu; and events of the Jewish life cycle, such as a Shabbat on which a wedding or brit mila is being celebrated in the community. In all of these, every line ends with the rhyming syllable "-hu", just as in “Yom Shabbat Zakhor”.
