= Aliyah (Torah) =

Honor of reciting the blessings that precede the chanting of a Torah portion

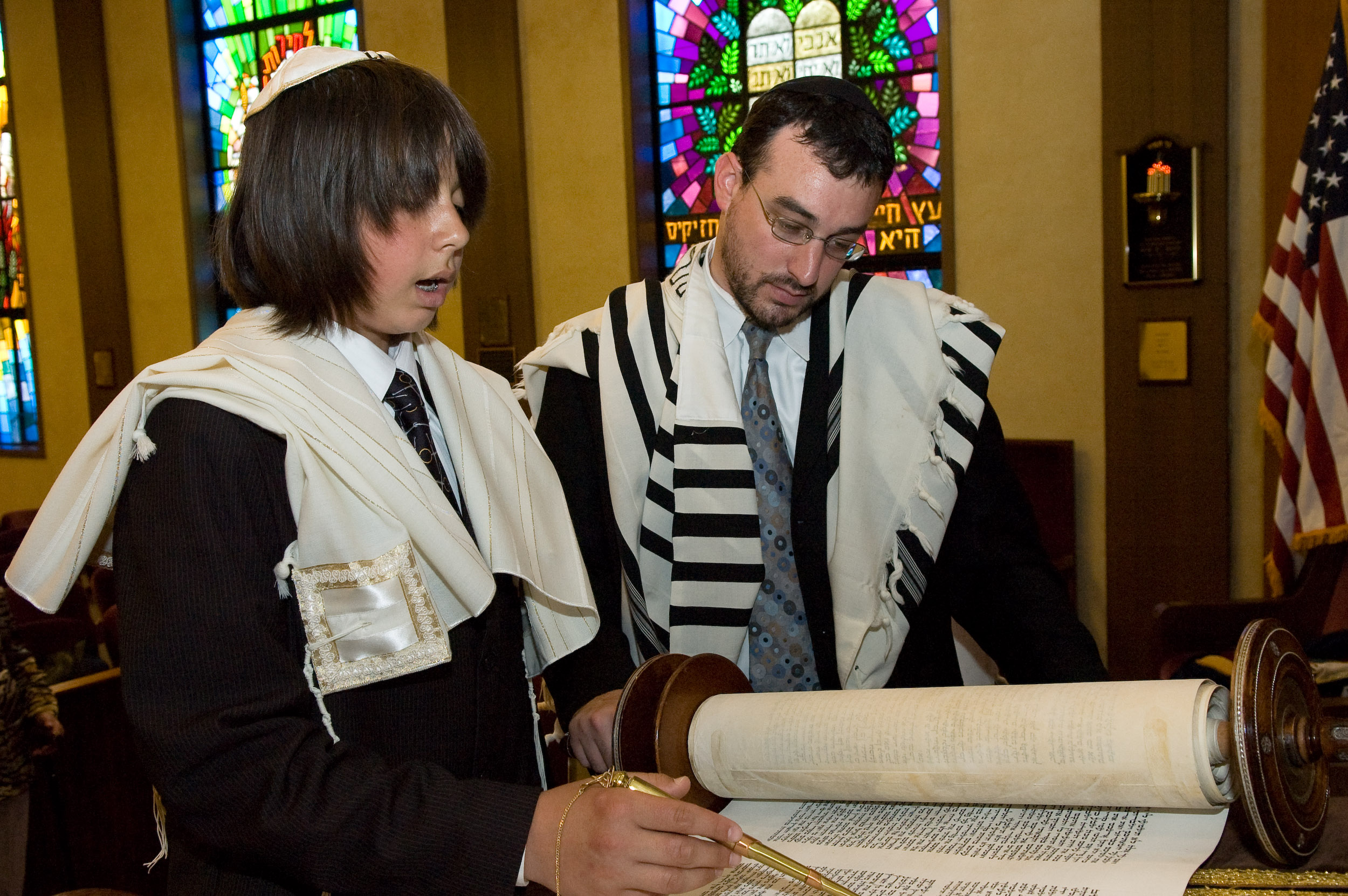

An aliyah (Hebrew: עליה; pl. עליות, aliyot; 'ascent' or 'going up') is the calling of a member of a Jewish congregation up to the bimah for a segment of the formal Torah reading. One receiving an aliyah is called an oleh (male) or olah (female).

The individual receiving the aliyah goes up to the bimah before the chanting and recites a series of blessings specific to ritualized Torah chanting. After the portion of the Torah is read, the recipient recites another blessing.

Babylonian Jewry completed the cycle of Torah portions annually, and Palestinian Jewry adopted a triennial cycle, according to Megillah 29b. The weekly chanting of the haftara, a portion of the Nevi'im linked by the Tannaim to the week's Torah portion, originated during the Mishnaic era (Megillah 24a). This practice probably began after the canonization of the Hebrew Bible and the ensuing effort by Jews to highlight the Jewish prophets.

== Process ==
The Torah reading consists of a series of aliyot: three on normal weekdays, seven on Shabbat, and other numbers on holidays.

Before each aliyah, a synagogue official (called a gabbai) calls up one person to receive that aliyah. Only men are eligible in Orthodox and some Conservative congregations, elsewhere both men and women are eligible.

Men are called with:

Ya'amod (Let him arise), [Hebrew Name] ben (son of) [Father's Hebrew name] [Ha-Kohen (the Kohen) / Ha-Levi (the Levite)], (the name of the Aliyah in Hebrew).

In synagogues where women may receive aliyot, women are called with:

Ta'amod (Let her arise), [Hebrew Name] bat (daughter of) [Father's Hebrew name] [Ha-Kohen (the Kohen) / Ha-Levi (the Levite)], (the name of the Aliyah in Hebrew).

The recipient recites a blessing over the Torah reading, then the Torah is read, then the recipient recites a second blessing. In many congregations, the recipient then stands to the side of the bimah during the next person's reading.

In most congregations, the oleh does not themself read the Torah aloud. Rather, they recite the blessings before and after the reading, and during the reading itself they stand near the Torah while a practiced expert, called a ba'al k'ri'ah ("one in charge of reading"; sometimes ba'al ko're), reads the Torah with cantillation for the congregation. In some congregations the oleh follows along with the expert, reading in a whisper.

In Yemenite communities, the oleh reads the portion themself, while another person, usually a young boy, recites the Targum after each verse.

After the last aliyah, half-kaddish is recited. When the Torah is read in the afternoon, kaddish is not recited at this point, but rather after the Torah has been returned to the Ark.

=== Kohen and Levi aliyot ===
According to Orthodox Judaism, the first oleh (person called to read) is a kohen and the second a Levite (assuming such people are present); the remaining olim are yisr'aelim — Jews who are neither kohen nor levi. The first two aliyot are referred to as "Kohen" and "Levi," while the rest are known by their number (in Hebrew).

This order was ordained to avoid public competition for the honor of being first.

If a kohen is present but a Levite is not, the same kohen who was called up for the first aliyah receives the second aliyah as well. If a kohen is not present, any Jew can be called up for any aliyah, but it is the custom in some congregations to then give the first Aliyah to a Levite.

Orthodox Judaism recognizes limited exceptions from the general principle that a Kohen is called first. For example, there are cases where calling a kohen first would prevent individuals celebrating special occasions from each having an aliyah. These include a groom celebrating an ufruf aliyah before a wedding, or a thirteen-year-old boy from celebrating his bar mitzvah aliyah. In large synagogues, multiple celebrations at the same time can result in a shortage of aliyot. In these situations, the Kohen is requested to forgo his birthright in respect to the needs of accommodating the occasion. Although halachically, the kohen is entitled to refuse giving up his first aliyah, the kohen will usually agree out of respect for the occasion.

==== In Conservative Judaism ====
The Conservative Rabbinical Assembly's Committee on Jewish Law and Standards has ruled that the practice of calling a kohen to the first aliyah represents a custom rather than a law, and thus, a Conservative rabbi is not obligated to follow it. However, some Conservative synagogues continue to follow it.

==== Reform and Reconstructionist views ====
Reform and Reconstructionist Judaism consider halakhah no longer binding and believe the entire ancient sacrificial system to be incompatible with modern sensibilities. They also acknowledge that caste- or gender-based distinctions such as having a priestly caste with distinct roles and obligations derived from heredity is morally incompatible with the principle of egalitarianism.

== Number of aliyot per day ==
Number of aliyot	Occasion
3	Mondays and Thursdays, Hanukkah, Purim, fast days, afternoon readings for Shabbat and Yom Kippur
4	Rosh Chodesh, Chol HaMoed
5	Passover, Shavuot, Rosh Hashanah, Sukkot, Shemini Atzeret, Simchat Torah
6	Yom Kippur morning
7	Shabbat morning

On Saturday mornings, there are seven olim, the maximum of any day, but more may be added if desired, by subdividing these seven aliyot or repeating passages (according to the custom of some communities). When a holiday or Yom Kippur coincides with Shabbat, the readings are divided into seven aliyot instead of five or six.

There are seven aliyot on a Sabbath (Megillah 21a). Bet Yoseph quotes a geonic source in explanation of this number (Ein Pochasim, Tur, Hilchot Shabbat 282). In the event that someone missed an entire week's services and as a result had not responded to the reader's daily invocation of Barechu, he may make up for it by responding to the Barechu of the seven blessings of the aliyot. A more acceptable reason is the midrashic explanation for the seven benedictions on the Sabbath (in place of the eighteen). The seven benedictions correspond to the seven voices of God (kol) mentioned in the Twenty-ninth Psalm and again in connection with the giving of the Torah (beginning with Exodus 19:16, Midrash Yelamdenu). This explanation is equally applicable to the seven aliyot.

== History ==
Initially, the Torah was read on the Sabbath or special occasions by the king, a prophet, or a kohen. In time, distinguished people were called to read portions of the Torah. The Torah was on a platform to which the reader ascended, hence the Hebrew term aliyah ("going up"). Eventually, the rabbis ordained that a professional reader do the reading to avoid embarrassing those who were unable to read the Torah script (Shabbat 11a).

== Simchat Torah ==
On Simchat Torah, the tradition is that all members of the congregation are called for an aliyah during the Shacharit service. There are various ways in which this is accomplished. In some congregations, this is done by repeating the first five readings of V'Zot HaBerachah until everyone receives an aliyah. In others, this is done by reading each section only once while calling groups for each aliyah. The final regular aliyah is known as Kol HaNe'arim, in which minor children (under Bar/Bat Mitzvah age) are called for a joint aliyah.

== Including women ==
Historically, only men received aliyot. In the late 12th and early 13th century, Rabbi Meir of Rothenburg ruled that, in a community consisting entirely of kohanim, the prohibition on calling kohanim for anything but the first two and maftir aliyot creates a deadlock situation which should be resolved by calling women to the Torah for all the intermediate aliyot. However, this opinion is rejected by virtually all Halachic authorities, and it is not even mentioned in Shulchan Aruch or its commentaries.

In 1955, the Committee on Jewish Law and Standards authorized women to have an aliyah at Torah-reading services.

== Covid-19 ==
In order to practice social distancing to limit the number of individuals on the bimah as congregations reopened during 2020 in later stages that year of the COVID-19 pandemic, Orthodox Union guidelines suggested that the person reading the Torah take all three aliyot.

== Non-gendered language ==
In 2022, the Committee on Jewish Law and Standards, the halakhic authority for the Conservative movement, authorized non-gendered language for the aliyah, and the honors of the hagbah (lifting the Torah) and the gelilah (rolling up the Torah). They also authorized non-gendered language for calling up Cohens and Levis (descendants of the tribe of Levi) as well as a way to address people without gendered language during the prayer Mi Shebeirach.
