= Kiddush =

Blessing of sanctification said by Jews at the beginning of Shabbat and holidays

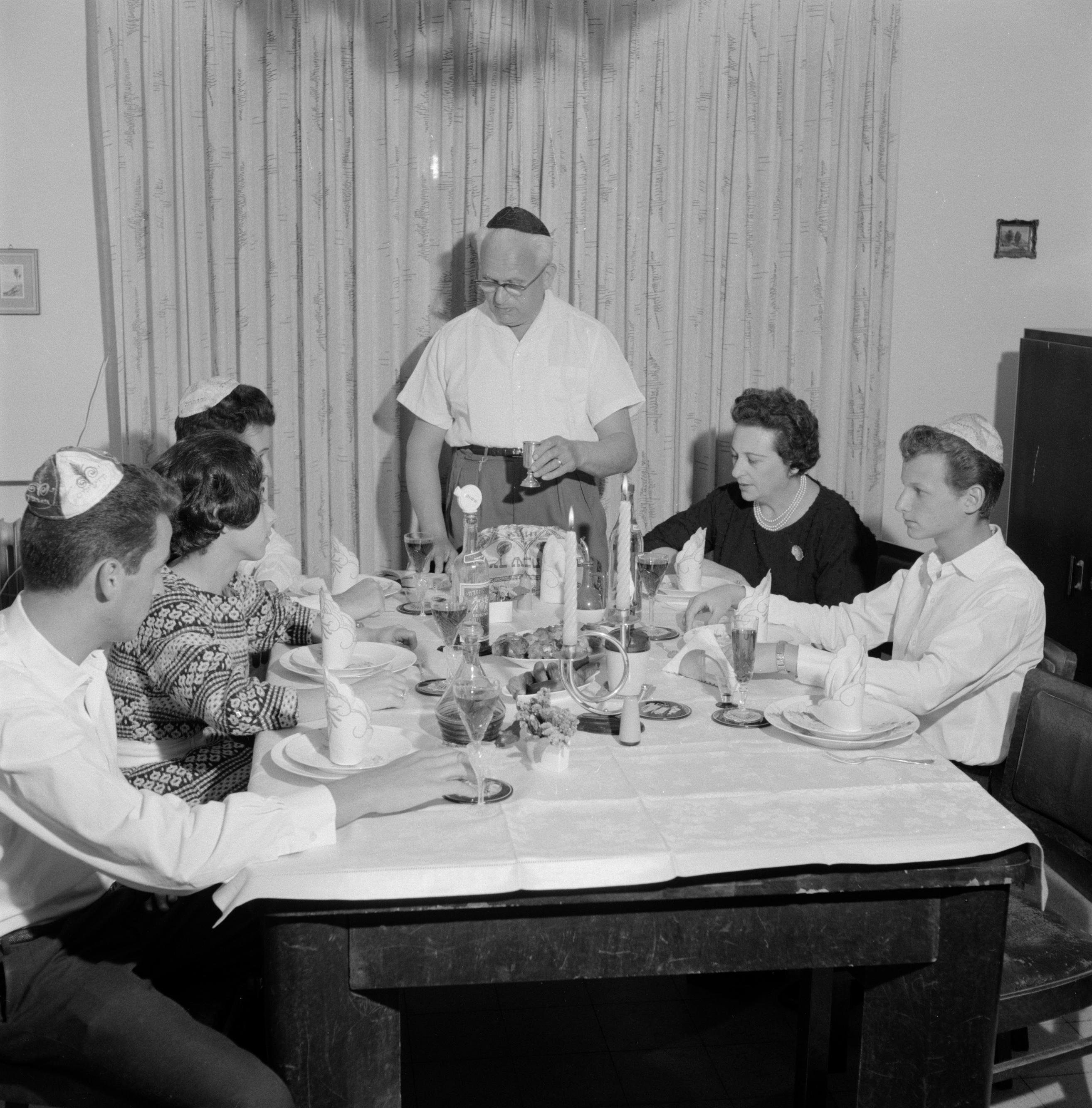
Kiddush at the start of the Friday evening Sabbath meal as recited by the male head of the household in previous generations (Israel, 1963).

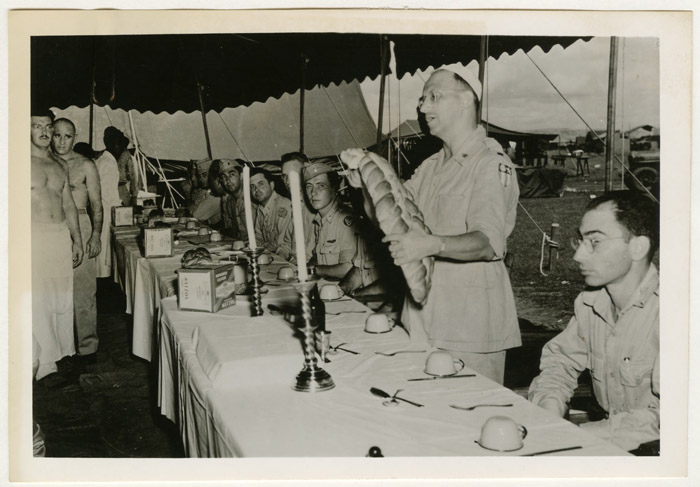
Chaplain Rabbi Abraham Dubin making the blessing over challah (India, 1944).

Kiddush (Hebrew: קִידּוּשׁ, lit. 'sanctification', modern: [ki'duʃ], biblical: [qid'duːʃ]; also English: /ˈkɪdɪʃ/) is a blessing recited over wine or grape juice to sanctify Shabbat and Jewish holidays. Additionally, the word refers to a small repast held on Shabbat and holidays after the prayer services and before the meal.

== Significance ==
The Torah refers to two requirements concerning Shabbat: to "keep it" and to "remember it" (shamor and zakhor). Jewish law therefore requires that Shabbat be observed in two respects. One must "keep it" by refraining from the 39 categories of activity prohibited on Shabbat, and one must "remember it" by making special arrangements for the day, and specifically through the kiddush ceremony.

Reciting kiddush before the meal on the eve of Shabbat and Jewish holidays is thus a commandment in the Torah (as explained by the Oral Torah). However, one can also fulfill the biblical commandment by reciting Maariv on Shabbat, which also commemorates the day's holiness. Reciting kiddush before the morning meal on Shabbat and holidays is a requirement of rabbinic origin. Kiddush is not usually recited at the third meal on Shabbat, although Maimonides thought that wine should be drunk at this meal as well.

== Rituals ==
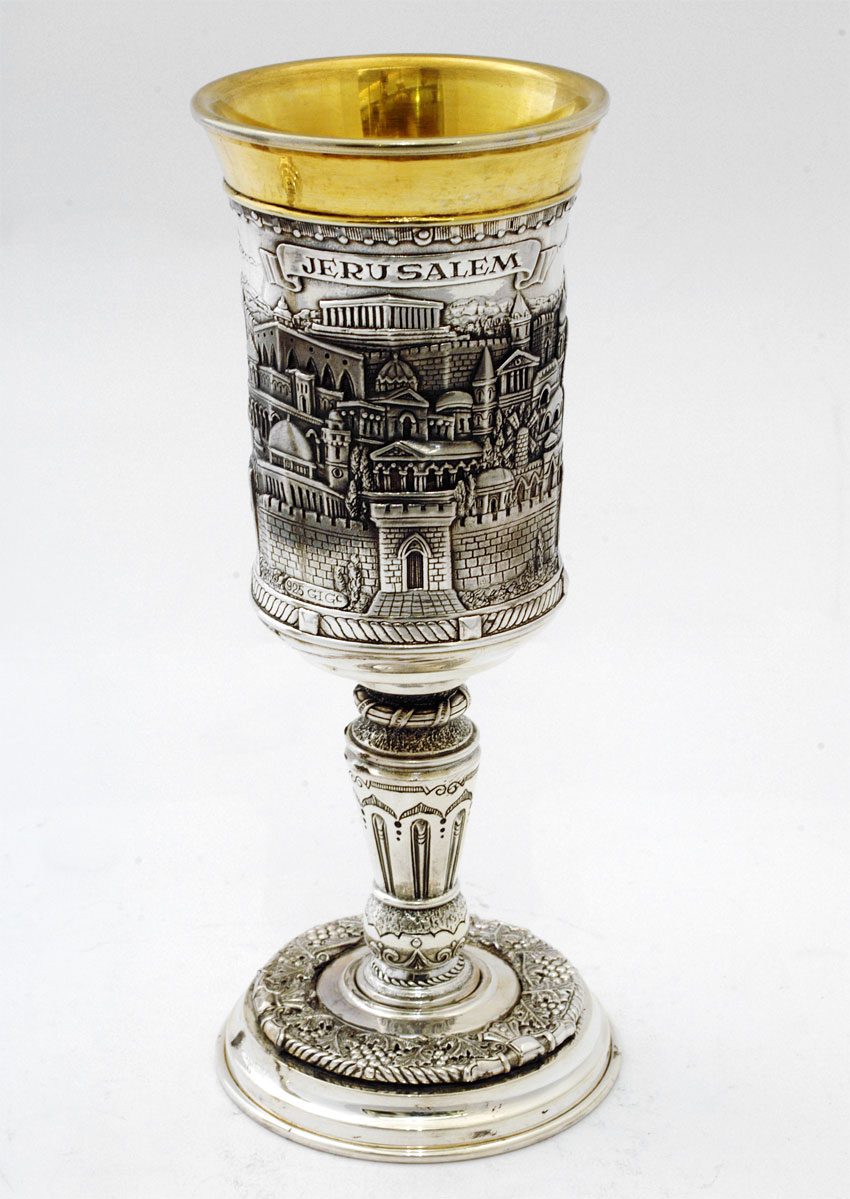
Engraved sterling silver kiddush cup

To honor the mitzvah of reciting kiddush, a silver goblet is often used, although any cup can suffice. The cup must hold a revi'it of liquid. A revi'it is between 161.5 millilitres (5.68 imp fl oz; 5.46 US fl oz) (Rabbi Avrohom Yeshaya Karelitz) and 90.7 millilitres (3.19 imp fl oz; 3.07 US fl oz) (Rabbi Avraham Chaim Naeh). After the person reciting the kiddush drinks from the wine, the rest of it is passed around the table or poured out into small cups for the other participants. Alternatively, wine is poured for each of the participants before kiddush.

Before reciting kiddush, the challah, which will be the next food item eaten in honor of the Shabbat or holiday, is first covered with a cloth. According to Halakha, the blessing over bread takes precedence to the blessing over wine. However, in the interests of beginning the meal with kiddush, the challah is covered to "remove" it from the table (some do not have the challah on the table at all during kiddush).

Wine or grape juice may be used for kiddush. The Talmud permits the use of unfermented fresh grape juice for sacramental use. While later legal codes have expressed a preference for wine, traditional and orthodox communities generally permit the use of grape juice in place of wine for blessings and rituals.

On Friday night kiddush may be recited over the challah; the blessing over bread is substituted for the blessing over wine. In that case, the ritual hand-washing normally performed prior to consuming the challah is done before the recitation of kiddush. Some Ashkenazic communities, especially German Jews and Hungarian Jews follow this procedure even if wine is present. If there is only sufficient wine or grape juice for one kiddush, it should be used for the Friday night kiddush.

In many synagogues, kiddush is recited on Friday night at the end of services. This kiddush does not take the place of the obligation to recite kiddush at the Friday night meal. When recited in a synagogue, the first paragraph (Genesis 2:1–3) is omitted.

The text of the Friday night kiddush begins with a passage from Genesis 2:1–3, as a testimony to God's creation of the world and cessation of work on the seventh day. Some people stand during the recital of these Biblical verses (even if they sit for kiddush), since according to Jewish law testimony must be given standing.

There are different customs regarding sitting or standing while reciting kiddush depending on communal and family tradition.

Some Hasidic and Sephardic Jews pour small amounts of water into the wine before kiddush on Friday night. This is done either to commemorate the old custom of "mixing of the wine" in the days when wine was too strong to be drunk without dilution, or to infuse the water (wine?) with the quality of mercy which is symbolized by water (wine?).

Since the Shabbat morning kiddush is rabbinically rather than biblically mandated, it has a lesser status than the Friday night kiddush. Its name Kiddusha Rabba (קידושא רבא, "The Great Kiddush"), first mentioned in the Talmud, is euphemistic. There are different versions for the kiddush on Sabbath morning, and it is generally shorter than the Friday night kiddush. Originally, this kiddush consisted only of the blessing over the wine. Later, additional verses related to Shabbat were added. However, there are a wide variety of customs as to which verse are recited, and in some communities no verses at all are recited. Some communities have a similarly brief Kiddush for the third Sabbath meal as well, made in the middle of the meal.

== Text ==
Occasion	Hebrew	English
Shabbat evening	וַיְהִי עֶרֶב וַיְהִי בֹקֶר יוֹם הַשִּׁשִּׁי׃ וַיְכֻלּוּ הַשָּׁמַיִם וְהָאָרֶץ וְכָל צְבָאָם׃ וַיְכַל אֱלֹהִים בַּיוֹם הַשְּׁבִיעִי מְלַאכְתּוֹ אֲשֶׁר עָשָׂה, וַיִשְׁבֹּת בַּיּוֹם הַשְּׁבִיעִי מִכָּל מְלַאכְתּוֹ אֲשֶׁר עָשָׂה׃ וַיְבָרֶךְ אֱלֹהִים אֶת יוֹם הַשְּׁבִיעִי וַיְקַדֵּשׁ אֹתוֹ, כִּי בוֹ שָׁבַת מִכָּל מְלַאכְתּוֹ אֲשֶׁר בָּרָא אֱלֹהִים לַעֲשׂוֹת׃ (סַבְרִי מָרָנָן וְרַבָּנָן וְרַבּוֹתַי.) בָּרוּךְ אַתָּה יְיָ אֱלֹהֵינוּ מֶלֶךְ הָעוֹלָם, בּוֹרֵא פְּרִי הַגָּפֶן. בָּרוּךְ אַתָּה יְיָ אֱלֹהֵינוּ מֶלֶךְ הָעוֹלָם, אֲשֶׁר קִדְּשָׁנוּ בְּמִצְוֹתָיו וְרַָצָה בָנוּ, וְשַׁבַּת קָדְשׁוֹ בְּאַהֲבָה וּבְרָצוֹן הִנְחִילָנוּ, זִכָּרוֹן לְמַעֲשֵׂה בְרֵאשִׁית. כִּי הוּא יוֹם תְּחִלָּה לְמִקְרָאֵי קֹדֶשׁ, זֵכֶר לִיצִיאַת מִצְרָיִם. כִּי בָנוּ בָחַרְתָּ וְאוֹתָנוּ קִדַּשְׁתָּ מִכָּל הָעַמִּים, וְשַׁבַּת קָדְשְׁךָ בְּאַהֲבָה וּבְרָצוֹן הִנְחַלְתָּנוּ. בָּרוּךְ אַתָּה יְיָ מְקַדֵּשׁ הַשַׁבָּת.	[Evening became morning]: The sixth day. And the heavens and the earth and all that filled them were complete. And on the seventh day God completed the labor He had performed, and He refrained on the seventh day from all the labor which He had performed. And God blessed the seventh day and He sanctified it, for He then refrained from all his labor – from the act of creation that God had performed. Permit me, distinguished ones, rabbis, guests and colleagues: Blessed are You, the Lord our God, King of the Universe, Creator of the fruit of the vine. (Amen) Blessed are You, Lord our God, King of the Universe, Who sanctified us with His commandments, and hoped for us, and with love and intent invested us with His sacred Sabbath, as a memorial to the deed of Creation. It is the first among the holy festivals, commemorating the exodus from Egypt. For You chose us, and sanctified us, out of all nations, and with love and intent You invested us with Your Holy Sabbath. Blessed are You, Adonai, Sanctifier of the Sabbath. (Amen)
Shabbat morning	(וְשָׁמְרוּ בְנֵי-יִשְׂרָאֵל, אֶת-הַשַּׁבָּת, לַעֲשׂוֹת אֶת-הַשַּׁבָּת לְדֹרֹתָם, בְּרִית עוֹלָם. בֵּינִי, וּבֵין בְּנֵי יִשְׂרָאֵל—אוֹת הִיא, לְעֹלָם: כִּי-שֵׁשֶׁת יָמִים, עָשָׂה יְהוָה אֶת-הַשָּׁמַיִם וְאֶת-הָאָרֶץ, וּבַיּוֹם הַשְּׁבִיעִי, שָׁבַת וַיִּנָּפַשׁ.) (זָכוֹר אֶת-יוֹם הַשַּׁבָּת, לְקַדְּשׁוֹ. שֵׁשֶׁת יָמִים תַּעֲבֹד, וְעָשִׂיתָ כָּל-מְלַאכְתֶּךָ. וְיוֹם, הַשְּׁבִיעִי—שַׁבָּת, לַיהוָה אֱלֹהֶיךָ: לֹא-תַעֲשֶׂה כָל-מְלָאכָה אַתָּה וּבִנְךָ וּבִתֶּךָ, עַבְדְּךָ וַאֲמָתְךָ וּבְהֶמְתֶּךָ, וְגֵרְךָ, אֲשֶׁר בִּשְׁעָרֶיךָ. כִּי שֵׁשֶׁת-יָמִים עָשָׂה יְהוָה אֶת-הַשָּׁמַיִם וְאֶת-הָאָרֶץ, אֶת-הַיָּם וְאֶת-כָּל-אֲשֶׁר-בָּם, וַיָּנַח, בַּיּוֹם הַשְּׁבִיעִי; עַל-כֵּן, בֵּרַךְ יְהוָה אֶת-יוֹם הַשַּׁבָּת—וַיְקַדְּשֵׁהוּ.) (סברי מרנן ורבנן ורבותי) בָּרוּךְ אַתָּה יְיָ אֱלֹהֵינוּ מֶלֶךְ הָעוֹלָם בּוֹרֵא פְּרִי הַגָּפֶן.	(Some begin with Isaiah 58:13–14.) (And the Children of Israel shall observe the Shabbat, by establishing the Shabbat for their generations as an eternal covenant. Between Me and the Children of Israel it is an eternal sign, that [in] six days the Lord made the heavens and the earth, and on the seventh day He ceased from work and rested.) (Remember the Shabbat day to sanctify it. Six days you shall labor and do all your work, but the seventh day is Shabbat for the LORD your God; you shall not do any work—you, your son and your daughter, your manservant and your maidservant, and your cattle, and the stranger who is in your gates. For [in] six days the Lord made the heavens, the earth, the sea, and all that is in them, and rested on the seventh day. Therefore, the Lord blessed the Shabbat day and made it holy.) Attention, gentlemen, [rabbis, and my teachers]! Blessed are You, LORD our God, King of the universe, who creates the fruit of the vine. (Amen)
Holiday evening (recited on the festival nights of Passover, Shavuot, Sukkot, and Shemini Atzeret/Simchat Torah)		(When the holiday coincides with Shabbat (Friday night), the verses from Genesis (Evening became... had performed) precede this kiddush, and the sections in brackets are added.) Attention, gentlemen, [rabbis, and my teachers]! Blessed are You, Lord our God, King of the universe, who creates the fruit of the vine. (Amen) Blessed are You, Lord our God, King of the universe, Who chose us from all the nations, and elevated us above all tongues, and sanctified us with His commandments. And You gave us, Lord our God, with love, [Sabbaths for rest and] festivals for happiness, holidays and times for joy, this day [of Shabbat and this day of]: (on Passover): the Festival of Matzos, the time of our freedom; (on Shavuot): the Festival of Weeks, the time of the giving of our Torah; (on Sukkot): the Festival of Succos, the time of our happiness; (on Shemini Atzeret/Simchat Torah): the eighth day, the Festival of Assembly, the time of our happiness; [With love], a holy convocation, a remembrance of the Exodus from Egypt. Because You chose us, and sanctified us from all the nations, [and Shabbat] and Your holy festivals [in love and in avor] in happiness and in joy You have given us as a heritage. Blessed are You, God, Who sanctifies [the Shabbat and] Israel and the holiday seasons. (Amen) (On Sukkot, if the meal takes place in a kosher sukkah:) Blessed are You, Lord our God, King of the universe, Who has sanctified us with His commandments and commanded us to dwell in the sukkah. (Amen) (On all holiday nights except on the last two nights of Passover:) Blessed are You, Lord our God, King of the universe, Who has kept us alive and sustained us and brought us to this season. (Amen)
Holiday morning		(When the festival coincides with Shabbat, first the Biblical verses (above, Shabbat morning) are recited.) (These are the festivals of God, holy convocations, that you should announce at their appointed times.) (And Moses declared the festivals of the Lord to the Children of Israel) Attention, Gentlemen! Blessed are You, Lord our God, King of the universe, who creates the fruit of the vine. (Amen)

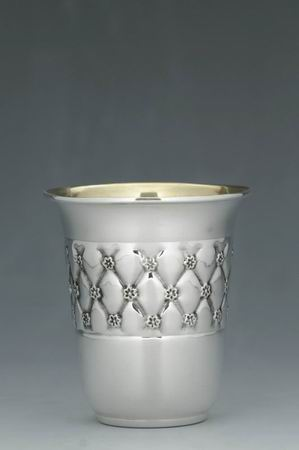
Sterling silver kiddush cup

=== Other variations ===
On Rosh Hashanah, the night Kiddush is similar to that of the other festivals. Where it differs, it is usually to follow the pattern of middle blessing of the Amidah. (An example is the concluding formula "Blessed are You, the LORD, King over the entire world, Who sanctifies [the Sabbath,] Israel, and the Day of Remembrance.") During the day, the verses Psalms 81:4–5 (Ashkenazi) or Numbers 10:10 (Sephardic) are recited prior to the blessing over wine. Many also say the festival verses (usually first), and on Shabbat all recite the relevant verses (see above) at the very beginning.

On Yom Kippur, being a fast day, no kiddush is recited, even by one who will be eating for medical reasons, and even on Shabbat.

On the first two nights of Sukkot, the blessing leishev ba-sukkah is recited at the end of Kiddush, after she-hechiyanu. On the second night in the Diaspora, some switch the order and recite leishev before she-hechiyanu. During the daytime kiddush, leishev is recited after the blessing on wine, before drinking. On the Sabbath of Chol Hamoed of Sukkot, leishev is recited at the end of kiddush.

=== Yaknehaz ===
When a festival is on Saturday night, Kiddush is recited, but Havdalah must also be said because Shabbat is holier than the festivals. The sequence of blessings in such a case is known as yak'n'haz (יקנה"ז), for yayin, kiddush, ner, havdalah, zman, meaning "wine, kiddush, flame, havdalah, shehecheyanu". That is, first the blessing over wine, then the standard kiddush blessing (see above), then the blessing for the flame (borei m'orei ha'eish, Who creates the radiance of the fire), then a modified havdalah blessing (ending with "Who differentiates between (one level of) holiness and (another level of) holiness"), and then the shehecheyanu blessing (omitted on the final days of Passover; see above). Essentially, the havdalah blessings are recited after kiddush, but before shehechiyanu, which is usually the last blessing to ever be recited. Spices are not used.

In the opposite case, when Shabbat follows a festival, the regular Shabbat kiddush is recited, with no variations.

==== Yaknehaz Candle ====
While on a year-round Motzai Shabbat one can extinguish the candle used for Havdalah, this is not permitted when the evening coincides with a Holiday date (Yom Tov). Rather than simply picking up two of the candles already lit for Yom Tov when the blessing for fire is recited as part of a modified Havdalah, and holding them so that their wicks are interlaced, it is easier to use a special two-wick candle as one of the Holiday candles; they are sized to fit in a regular Shabbat candelabra or candlestick holder (in place of a standard one-wick candle).

This special candle is called a Yaknehaz Candle.

== Synagogue kiddush ==
In many Ashkenazic communities, Kiddush is recited at the end of Friday night services even though nobody eats there. This was instituted in ancient times on behalf of guests who slept in the synagogue and did not have a place to eat, and Halachic authorities debate whether it is proper to continue this practice.

The term kiddush also refers to refreshments served either at home or at the synagogue following prayer services on Shabbat or Yom Tov, which begin with the recitation of kiddush. Typically served at an Ashkenazic Kiddush are items such as cake, crackers, gefilte fish, herring, kugel and cholent. On Shavuot morning, the custom is to serve dairy foods such as cheesecake and cheese blintzes for the kiddush.

According to the Shulchan Aruch, kiddush should be recited preceding the Shabbat meal. Eating mezonot such as cake or cookies or drinking an additional revi'it of wine is also sufficient according to the opinion of most Rishonim. Nevertheless, some Jews recite kiddush only when about to partake of a full meal.

Often a kiddush is hosted by a family celebrating the birth of a daughter, a bar mitzvah, a wedding, an engagement, a birthday, or other happy occasion. Some people also host a kiddush on the yahrtzeit of a parent or other relative. In some synagogues the celebrant is honored with reciting the Shabbat morning kiddush on behalf of all the attendees. In other synagogues the rabbi or gabbai recites the kiddush. Some Jews make kiddush on Shabbat morning over liquor instead of wine. When this is done, the blessing recited is she-hakol nihyeh bid'varo instead of borei p'ri ha-gafen. The Mishnah Berurah (an authoritative Ashkenazi halakhic text) rules that under extenuating circumstances, liquor may be substituted for wine on the grounds that it is Hamar Medina, a drink one would serve to a respected guest; nevertheless, many rely on this even without extenuating circumstances.

== History of using white wine ==
During the 17th century, because of blood libels, David HaLevi Segal "issued a Passover ruling ... that the traditional red wine used at the Seders be substituted with white wine in lands of persecution in order to not arouse suspicion."

== See also ==
- Kosher wine
