= Barechu =

Jewish call to prayer

Barechu (Hebrew: ברכו, romanized: Bārək̲u, lit. 'Bless!'; may also be transliterated as bar'chu or barekhu) is the call to prayer during Jewish prayer. The wording has its origins in Psalm 134:1-2 and 135:19-20, but the blessing was standardized later, in the Talmud.

== Practice ==
The Barekhu is recited twice daily: during Shacharit (morning prayer) and Maariv (evening prayer) as part of the formal public prayer services. It is only recited in the presence of a minyan. In addition to morning and evening prayer services, the Barekhu is also recited as part of each aliyah (Torah reading).

While the Barekhu is always read before the Shema, it is common in some communities, particularly Mizrahi and some Hasidic communities, to recite the blessing again at the end of both shaharit and maʿariv for the benefit of those who arrived late to the service. This has been adopted by many Israeli Ashkenazi communities as well, although most Nusach Ashkenaz communities in Israel omit the last Barekhu on morning with the Torah reading since it is recited before, and on Friday nights (when it is uncommon to have latecomers).

The leader must stand for the Barekhu; in the minhag Ashkenaz, the congregation stands as well, but in the Sephardic tradition, the congregation remains sitting. The leader of the service bows at the waist upon reciting the first word (barechu), and the congregation bows as they say the word baruch. In the Sephardi tradition, the congregants slightly stand up for a moment just enough to be able to bow.

According to the old Ashkenazi custom, when the hazzan says "Barekhu", the congregation recites a series of verses beginning with Yitbarach in an undertone.

== Text of the prayer ==
בָּרְכוּ אֶת יְיָ הַמְבֹרָךְ
בָּרוּךְ יְיָ הַמְבֹרָךְ לְעוֹלָם וָעֶד

Bārək̲u et̲ YY ham-məb̲orāk̲!
Bāruk̲ YY ham-məb̲ōrāk̲ ləʿolām wāʿed̲

Call: Bless YHWH, the blessed!
Response: Blessed be YHWH, the blessed, for eternity.

== See also ==
- Adhan, the Islamic call to prayer
