= Maariv =

Jewish prayer of the evening

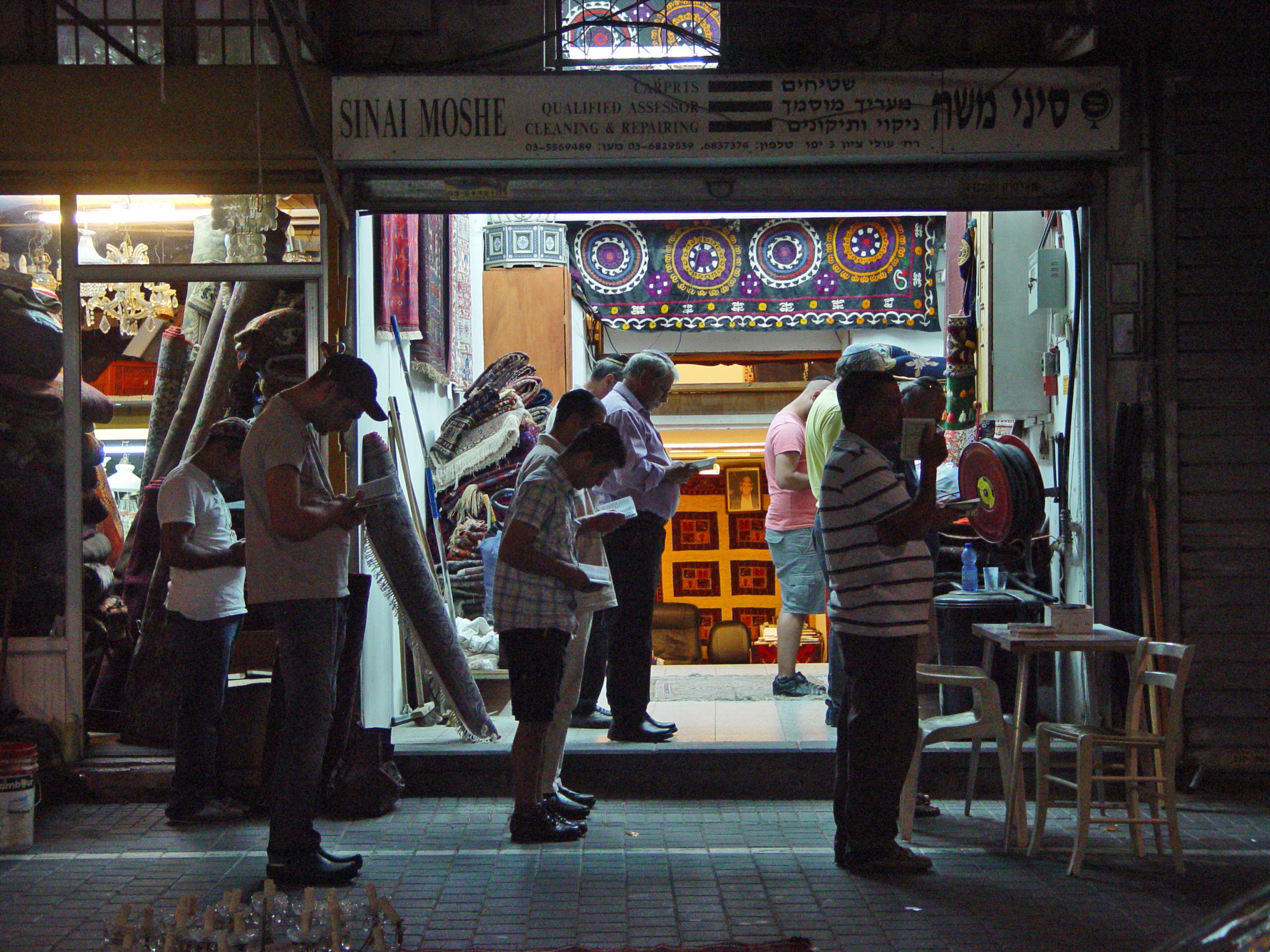
Maariv minyan in a Jaffa Tel Aviv flea-market shop

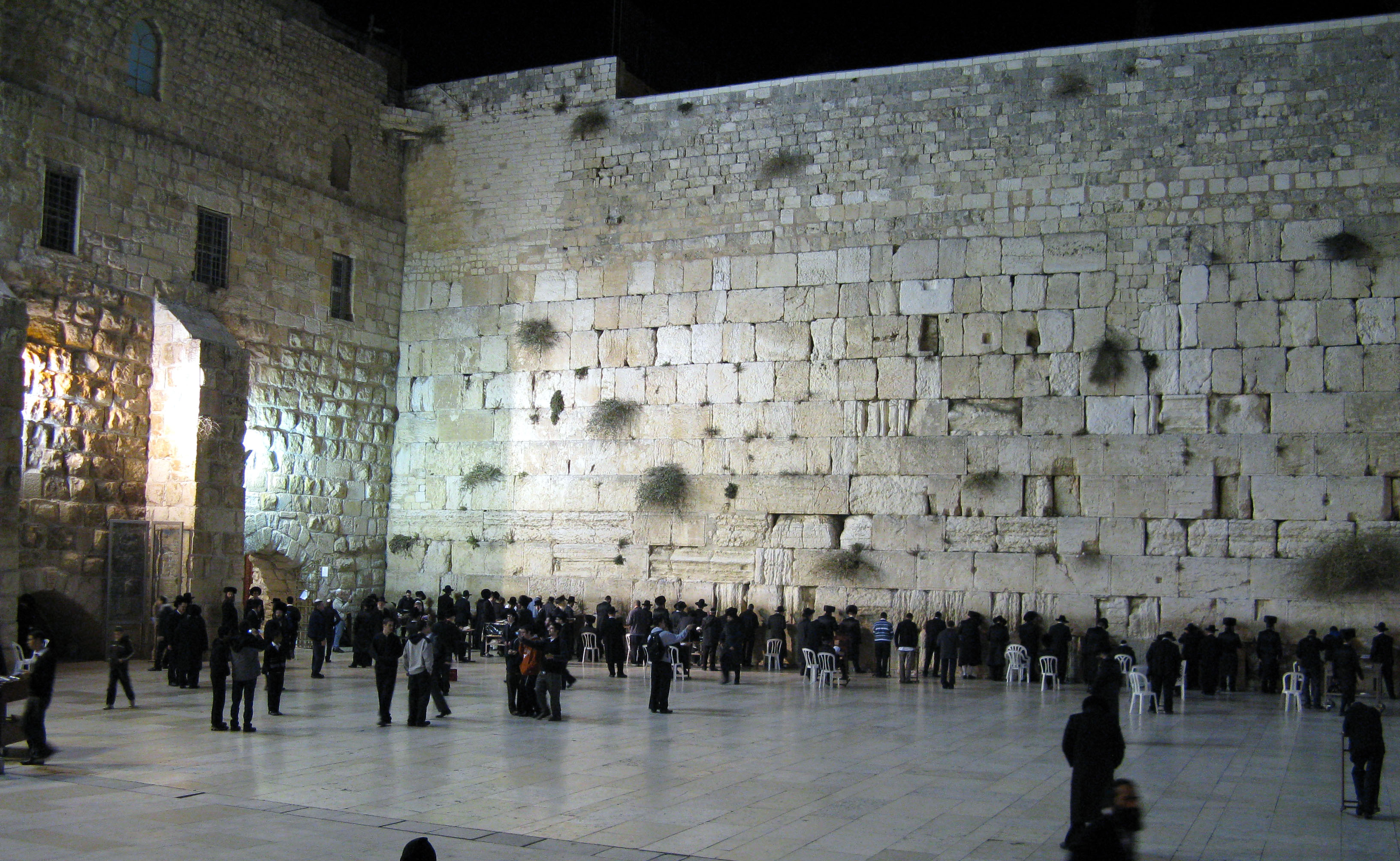
Maariv at the Western Wall

Maariv (pronounced [maʔaˈʁiv]; Hebrew: מַעֲרִיב, romanized: Maʿarīḇ), also known as Arvit ([ʔaʁˈvit]; עַרְבִית, ʿarbīt), (Note: Sometimes transliterated as Arbit) is a Jewish prayer service held in the evening or at night. It consists primarily of the evening Shema and Amidah.

The service will often begin with two verses from the book of Psalms, followed by the communal recitation of Barechu. The three paragraphs of the Shema are then said, both preceded and followed by two blessings; sometimes, a fifth blessing is added at the end. The hazzan (cantor) then recites a half-Kaddish. Everyone says the Amidah quietly, and, unlike at the other services, the hazzan does not repeat it. The hazzan recites the full Kaddish, Aleinu is recited, and the mourners' Kaddish ends the service; some groups recite another psalm before or after Aleinu. Other components occasionally added include the counting of the Omer (between Passover and Shavuot) and, in many communities, Psalm 27 (between the first of Elul and the end of Sukkot).

Maariv is generally recited after sunset and according to some opinions should preferably be delayed until after nightfall. However, it may be recited as early as one and a quarter seasonal hours before sunset (according to some opinions, before nightfall). This is common only on Friday nights in order to begin Shabbat earlier. At the conclusion of Shabbat and on holidays, the service is usually delayed until nightfall. While Maariv should technically be prayed before midnight, it may be recited until daybreak or even sunrise.

== Etymology ==
The word Maariv is the first significant word in the opening blessing of the evening service. It is derived from the Hebrew word erev (עֶרֶב), which translates to "evening". Maariv is a conversion of this word into a verb, which becomes "bringing on evening." The name comes from the end of the first blessing preceding the evening Shema:

בָּרוּךְ אַתָּה יי אֱלֹקֵינוּ מֶֽלֶךְ הָעוֹלָם אֲשֶׁר בִּדְבָרוֹ מַעֲרִיב עֲרָבִים בְּחָכְמָה פּוֹתֵֽחַ שְׁעָרִים וּבִתְבוּנָה מְשַׁנֶּה עִתִּים וּמַחֲלִיף אֶת הַזְּ֒מַנִּים וּמְסַדֵּר אֶת־הַכּוֹכָבִים בְּמִשְׁמְ֒רוֹתֵיהֶם בָּרָקִֽיעַ כִּרְצוֹנוֹ: בּוֹרֵא יוֹם וָלָֽיְלָה גּוֹלֵל אוֹר מִפְּ֒נֵי חֽשֶׁךְ וְחֽשֶׁךְ מִפְּ֒נֵי אוֹר וּמַעֲבִיר יוֹם וּמֵבִיא לָֽיְלָה וּמַבְדִּיל בֵּין יוֹם וּבֵין לָֽיְלָה יְהֹוָה צְבָאוֹת שְׁמוֹ: אֵל חַי וְקַיָּם תָּמִיד יִמְלֹךְ עָלֵֽינוּ לְעוֹלָם וָעֶד: בָּרוּךְ אַתָּה יְהֹוָה הַמַּעֲרִיב עֲרָבִים:

Blessed are You, HaShem, our God, King of the Universe, Who, with His word He brings on evenings, with wisdom He opens the gates (of heaven); and with understanding changes the times and alternates the seasons, and arranges the stars in their watches, in the sky, according to His will. He creates day and night, He rolls the light away from before darkness, and darkness from before light; He causes day to pass and brings night, and separates between day and night; Adonoy of Hosts is His Name. The Almighty, [Who is] living and enduring will always reign over us forever and ever. Blessed are You, HaShem, Who brings on evening.

— The Metsudah Siddur (1981), Siddur Ashkenaz

Arvit is the adjective form of this word, roughly translated as "of the evening". It shares the same etymological root as maghrib, the Islamic evening prayer.

== Origin ==
Maariv corresponds to the evening observances in the Temple in Jerusalem. Although no sacrifices were brought at night, any animal parts that were not burned during the day could be offered at night. Since this was not always necessary, the evening prayer was also declared optional. However, Jews long ago accepted it as an obligation, so it is now considered to be mandatory. However, there remain some vestiges of its original voluntary status; for example, the Amidah is not repeated by the leader, unlike all other prayers (an exception being on Shabbat, when the leader recites an abbreviated repetition, see below).

Another explanation is that as the third prayer, Maariv corresponds to Jacob, the third patriarch. Support is brought from Genesis 28:11, which relates that when Jacob left his hometown of Beersheba to go to Haran, he "came upon a place and stopped there for the night, for the sun had set." The Bible makes no mention of Jacob praying at this time, only that he lay his head on a rock and went to sleep. But the late antique Jewish sages known as Chazal nevertheless opined, in tractate Berakhot 26b:5 of the Talmud, that the Torah meant that Jacob prayed at night—thus instituting the service of Maariv. Some suggest that Jacob first started reciting the prayer after he fled from his homeland, and as a result, the prayer service has become associated with trust in God.

== Time ==
Generally, the time when Maariv can first be recited is when the time for reciting Mincha ends. But there are varying opinions on this. Maariv should not begin before 1¼ proportional hours before sunset. Others delay Maariv until after sunset or after dusk. If Maariv is recited prior to dusk, individuals repeat the Shema later in the evening.

=== Back-to-back Mincha and Maariv ===
In many congregations, the afternoon and evening prayers are recited back-to-back, to save people having to attend synagogue twice. (Note: In strict law, one should recite Mincha between sunset and nightfall only if one recites Arvit after nightfall. Conversely one should recite Arvit between sunset and nightfall only if one recites Mincha before sunset. In other words, one should not combine both prayers in the period between sunset and nightfall. The prevailing practice is to convene for Mincha shortly before sunset, so that Arvit may be prayed after sunset. On yet another view, the disputed period is not that between sunset and nightfall but between Plag Hamincha and sunset, that is, last one and one-quarter seasonal hours before sunset.) The Vilna Gaon discouraged this practice, and followers of his set of customs commonly wait until after nightfall to recite Ma'ariv, since the name derives from the word "nightfall". (Note: One reason for this is that, while the prevailing practice may satisfy the law concerning the timing of Arvit in the sense of the evening Amidah, it means that the evening Shema is recited too early and must be repeated after nightfall, see Berakhot 2a for a discussion of the time for the evening Shema.)

=== On Shabbat ===
On the eve of Shabbat, some have the custom to recite the Maariv prayer earlier than usually, generally during Pelag Hamincha (1¼ hours before sunset). This is in order to fulfill the precept of adding from the weekday to the holiness of Shabbat. However, this is too early for the recitation of Shema, so Shema should be repeated later under these circumstances.

== Prayers included ==
=== Introductory prayers ===
On weekdays, the service begins with two verses from Psalms: 78:38 and 20:10. In some communities, these verses are proceeded by Psalm 134, a few assorted verses, and a half Kaddish.

=== Shema ===
The first main part of the service is focused on the Shema Yisrael.

When a minyan is present, Barechu, the formal public call to prayer, is recited. Then come two blessings, one praising God for creating the cycle of day and night, and one thanking God for the Torah.

The three passages of the Shema are then recited.

Two more blessings are recited. The first praises God redemption, specifically mentioning taking the Jews out of Egypt, and the second prays for protection during the night.

A fifth blessing, Baruch Adonai L'Olam, is then recited by Ashkenazim outside of Israel (except for some chassidic communities such as Chabad-Lubavitch, and followers of the Vilna Gaon). This blessing is made mostly from a tapestry of biblical verses. However, the blessing is omitted on Shabbat and holidays, and by some at the conclusion of those days and on Chol HaMoed. It has been largely dropped by Sephardic communities, but appears in old printings of Sephardic siddurim (including Venice and Livorno). However, some Moroccan communities (both in Israel and elsewhere) recite the last part of the (starting from Yir'u eineinu), usually only on at the conclusion of the Sabbath.

In Israel, Baruch Adonai L'Olam is not recited by Ashkenazim (both Nusach Ashkenaz and Nusach Sefard), although it is recited by some congregations associated with Machon Moreshes Ashkenaz. It is recited by Baladi Yemenite Jews in and out of Israel (albeit combined with the last blessing), (Note: Tikhlal) and by Italian rite Jews in and out of Israel. (Note: As it appears in Italian rite siddurim. It is recited in practice in the Italian synagogue in Jerusalem when they have weekday maariv.) However, some Moroccan communities (both in Israel and elsewhere) recite the last part of the (starting from Yir'u eineinu), usually only on at the conclusion of the Sabbath. (Note: Siddur Avoteinu.)

On Shabbat and holidays, some congregations recite relevant verses at this point, after the last Shema blessing.

On Festivals, some Ashkenazic communities recite piyyutim called Ma'arivim during the blessings of Shema. The most well-known of these piyyutim is Lel Shimurim Oto El Hatzah, recited on the first night of Passover. In the past, this was also done by Italian and Romaniote Jews.

=== Amidah ===
This is followed by the Shemoneh Esreh (Amidah). Half Kaddish is recited just before the Amidah, in order to separate between the required Shema and the (originally) optional Amidah. The Amidah is followed by the full Kaddish (sometime with additions recited beforehand, see below).

Unlike in other prayers, the Amidah is not repeated aloud by the chazzan in Maariv.

=== Concluding prayers ===
Sephardim (and, in Israel, most who follow Nusach Sefard) then say Psalm 121 (or another topical Psalm), say the Mourner's Kaddish and repeat Barechu, before concluding with the Aleinu. Ashkenazim, in the diaspora, neither say Psalm 121 nor repeat Barechu, but conclude with Aleinu followed by the Mourner's Kaddish (in Israel, most Ashkenazim do repeat Barechu after mourner's Kaddish).

From the beginning of Elul through Hoshanah Rabbah (and outside of Israel, on Shemini Atzeret as well), most Nusach Ashkenaz communities recite Psalm 27, which contains many allusions to the Days of Awe and Sukkot. This is again followed by the mourner's Kaddish. In a house of mourning, many communities conclude the service with Psalm 16 or Psalm 49. In the Western Ashkenazic rite (as well as some German and Hungarian communities following the Eastern Ashkenazic rite), Psalms 24, 8 and 28 are recited when maariv is recited after nightfall; these can be followed by a Mourners Kaddish if needed (since these communities usually only allow one mourner to recite each Kaddish).

== Additions ==
=== Friday night ===
In most communities, the verses normally recited before barekhu are omitted, and the service begins with barekhu.

In most communities (except Chabad, those who follow the Vilna Gaon, and some Baladi Yemenites), the verses Exodus 31:16-17 are recited proceeding half kaddish before the Amidah.

At the beginning of Shabbat on Friday night, the Amidah is immediately followed by the recitation of Genesis 1–3 which discusses God's "resting" on the seventh day of creation. Although these verses were already said during the Amidah (and will be recited yet again during Kiddush at home) they are repeated. This is because when Shabbat coincides with a holiday, the Amidah does not include the passage.

The three verses are followed by the Seven-Faceted Blessing. This is a single blessing designed to summarize the seven blessings of the Amidah, for those who came late. (Note: It is not clear whether this is meant to replace the latecomers' Amidah, or to give them additional time by prolonging the service. In any case, the Shulchan Aruch (OC 268:13) rules that one who hears this blessing from the leader has fulfilled his obligation of reciting the Amidah.) While originally this was said only by the leader, it is now customary in most Ashkenazic communities (except for those who follow the practices of the Vilna Gaon) for the congregation to recite the middle part before the leader does so or together with the leader. (Note: as per Rama, Shulchan Aruch OC 268:8.) In the most communities of the Eastern Ashkenazic rite as well as many Sephardic communities, this blessing is omitted on the first night of Passover, because that is considered a "time of protection"; in the Western Ashkenazic rite as well as some other communities, it is recited as normal. (Note: See also Jonah Frankel, Passover Machzor, page 9 of the introduction.)

In communities that did not recite ba-meh madlikin before maariv, it is recited after the full Kaddish. Many communities also recite kiddush at this point.

=== After Shabbat ===
During the Maariv service following Shabbat, several additions are made.

At the beginning of the service, many communities recite (usually sing) Psalm 144 and Psalm 67.

A paragraph called "Ata Chonantanu" is inserted into the fourth blessing of the Amidah. The recitation of this paragraph officially ends Shabbat. One who forgets to recite this paragraph may also end Shabbat through Havdalah or by saying the words "Blessed is He Who differentiates between the holy and the secular."

Two sections of prayers, "Vayehi Noam" (the last verse from Psalm 90, followed by the full Psalm 91) and V'Ata Kadosh (all but the first two verses of Uva Letzion), are added to the service. These prayers are recited out of mercy for the wicked. The wicked are given a reprieve from Gehinnom during Shabbat, and the reprieve continues until all evening prayers following Shabbat are concluded. In Nusach Ashkenaz and Nusach Sefard, these verses are only recited if there are a full six days of work in the upcoming week; if there is a major festival falling in the middle of the week, they are omitted. If the first day of Passover falls the following Sabbath, customs very as to whether the Eve of Passover, generally considered a minor holiday, is enough to exempt the recitation of these verses.

Nusach Ashkenaz and Italian Nusach also add "Veyiten Lecha" (whereas Nusach Sefard and most Sfardim say this at home after Havdala). These are verses of blessing, that we pray should be fulfilled over the course of the week. These verses are recited even when 'Vayehi Noam' is omitted, but they are omitted when Tisha Bav falls at the conclusion of the Sabbath.

In some communities, Havdalah is also recited at this point.

=== Counting of the Omer ===
During the seven weeks from the second night of Passover until (but not including) Shavuot, the day is counted. This is usually done during Maariv, just before Aleinu (in communities that recite Veyiten Lecha before Aleinu at the conclusion of the Sabbath, most communities count the Omer before Veyiten Lecha). Others postpone the counting until the end of the service. If it is not yet nightfall, many congregations leave the counting to the individual.

=== Other additions ===
In general, relatively few prayers are added onto Maariv. On Festivals, some communities recite piyyutim called Maarivim during the blessings of Shema; in many communities, these piyyutim are omitted when the Festival falls on the Sabbath. On Simchat Torah, the Torah is read during Maariv in many communities. On Purim, the Book of Esther is read, followed by V'Ata Kadosh, and on Tish'a Ba'av the Book of Lamentations and some kinnot are recited, also followed by V'Ata Kadosh. On Yom Kippur, an extended order of Selichot is recited; in Ashkenazic communities, this is followed by Avinu Malkeinu (except on the Sabbath). On both Rosh Hashanah and Yom Kippur, many congregations recite Psalm 24.

== See also ==
- Shacharit
- Brakha
- Mincha
- Mussaf
- Ne'ila
- Maghrib — Islamic prayer; with same etymology
- Maariv (newspaper)
