= Seven-Faceted Blessing =

The Seven-Faceted Blessing (Hebrew: ברכה אחת מעין שבע, berakha aḥat me‘en sheva‘), also known as Magen Avot (מגן אבות), is a blessing recited in the Jewish liturgy of Friday evenings. It is similar to the out-loud repetition of the Amidah, which is recited in each daytime prayer. On typical evenings, the Amidah is recited only silently, with no out-loud repetition, but on Friday nights, in honor of the Sabbath, the Seven-Faceted Blessing is recited as an abbreviated repetition.

As the normal Sabbath Amidah prayer contains seven blessings, the Seven-Faceted Blessing contains a condensed version of the themes in these seven blessings. The Seven-Faceted Blessing begins with the beginning of the text of the first blessing of the Amidah; continues with the paragraph "Magen Avot (מגן אבות), which summarizes the themes of all seven blessings of the Sabbath Amidah; and concludes with a paragraph about the sanctity of the sabbath, and a concluding sentence: "Blessed are You, O Lord, who sanctifies the Sabbath."

The Seven-Faceted Blessing is recited every Friday evening of the year, even if it coincides with a festival or Yom Kippur. This is in contrast to most of the Sabbath liturgy, which is jettisoned if a particular Sabbath falls on a festival or on Yom Kippur.

In the Eastern Ashkenazic rite and in most Sephardic communities, this blessing is omitted on the first night of Passover, because that is considered a "time of protection"; in the Western Ashkenazic rite as well as many Chasidic communities, it is recited as normal.

The text of the Seven-Faceted Blessing (in accordance with the Ashkenazic version—other traditions have very similar versions) can be found in Seder Avodat Yisra’el on pp. 190–191. The text used in most Western Sephardic Communities can be found in "Seder Tefilah" of Mantua.

In medieval Europe, it was fairly common for congregations to insert special poems, called Magen Avot piyyutim, into the middle of this blessing; while this is less common today, some Western Ashkenazic communities (such as Khal Adath Jeshurun) recite such a piyyut when the second night of Shavuot falls on the Sabbath.

== Reasons for its enactment ==
The reason that the Sages of Israel enacted that the seven blessings of the prayer be abridged and recited aloud by the precentor (Heb. shaliach tzibbur) is explained by Rashi in Babylonian Talmud (Shabbat 24b) as being because of an assumed danger (סכנה), namely, in order to delay a little those leaving the synagogue, so that those who arrived late may hear the blessings and leave with everyone else. Since the synagogues were usually built outside the city, it was considered dangerous for latecomers to walk home alone at night, especially on the night of the Sabbath, when the celestial influences of Mars (i.e., bloodshed) were prevalent. The Jerusalem Talmud (Berakhot 8:1) brings down a different explanation, saying that, in Lower Mesopotamia, the abridged prayer was enacted to be said in the synagogues for guests on Shabbat eve only in such places where wine was not available to them. By hearing the recital of this blessing, it sufficed for the sanctification of the day, provided that the precentor concludes with the blessing, "Blessed are you, O Lord our God, King of the universe, who sanctifies Israel and the Sabbath day." This provision also prevented the guests from having to search from place to place at night for a cup of wine.
