= Aleinu =

Jewish prayer

Aleinu (Hebrew: עָלֵינוּ, romanized: ʿaleinū, lit. '[it is] upon us'), or Aleinu l'Shabei'akh (עָלֵינוּ לְשַׁבֵּחַ, ʿaleinū lɘ-šabeaḥ, '[it is] upon us to praise [God]'), is a Jewish prayer traditionally recited at the end of most Jewish religious services, including weekday Shacharit, Mincha, and Maariv services; the close of Mussaf services on Shabbat and during festivals; and in the middle of the Rosh Hashanah Mussaf. It is recited following Kiddush levana and brit milah services, as well. It is second only to the Kaddish (counting all its forms) as the most frequently recited prayer in the current synagogue liturgy.

== History ==
A folkloric tradition attributes Aleinu to the biblical Joshua at the Fall of Jericho. This might have been inspired by the fact that the first letters of the first four verses spell, in reverse, Hoshea, which was the childhood name of Joshua (Numbers 13:16). Another attribution is to the Men of the Great Assembly during the Second Temple period.

An early—that is, pre-Christian—origin of the prayer is evidenced by its explicit mention of bowing and kneeling practices associated with the Temple in Jerusalem and its non-mention of Babylonian captivity or a desire to restore the Kingdom of Judah or the Temple. On the other hand, it has been argued that the phrase "to speedily see God's crown and power" is in fact, a request for the speedy rebuilding of the Temple. The allusion is based on Psalm 78:61 and 96:6. If so, at least the second paragraph of Aleinu was written after the destruction of the Temple in 70 CE, perhaps around the time of Abba Arikha.

Its first appearance is the manuscript of the Rosh Hashana liturgy by the 3rd-century Babylonian Talmudic sage Abba Arikha. He included it in the Rosh Hashanah mussaf service as a prologue to the "Kingship" portion of the Amidah. For that reason, some attribute to Arikha the authorship, or at least the revising, of Aleinu.

In Blois, France, in 1171, it is alleged that a number of Jewish martyrs—reportedly 34 men and 17 women—were burned at the stake for refusing to renounce their faith. They are said to have gone to their deaths bravely singing Aleinu to a "soul-stirring" melody, which astonished their executioners. Some have suggested that this act of martyrdom inspired the adoption of Aleinu into the daily liturgy. But Aleinu is already found at the end of weekday Shacharit in the Machzor Vitry in the early 12th century, well before 1171.

== Text ==
The following is the first paragraph of the prayer across the traditional Jewish rites, with bracketed words indicating variations among the Ashkenazi, Sephardic/Mizrahi, Italian, and Yemenite traditions (there is also a second paragraph, ʿAl ken nekaveh, which the Yemenite, Italian, and Western Sephardic rites omit on weekdays, though it is a standard part of the daily Ashkenazi, Hasidic, and eastern Sephardic liturgy). To remain neutral across regional liturgical pronunciations, the romanization represents the consonantal framework and Begadkefat spirantization marks (ḇ, ḡ, ḏ, ḵ, p̄, ṯ) with a basic five-vowel system (a, e, i, o, u).

#	English translation	Transliteration	Hebrew
1	It is our duty to praise the Master of all,	ʿAleinu le-šabbeaḥ la-ʾAḏon ha-kol,	עָלֵינוּ לְשַׁבֵּחַ לַאֲדוֹן הַכֹּל,
2	to ascribe greatness to the Author of creation,	la-ṯeṯ geḏulla le-yoṣer bereʾšiṯ,	לָתֵת גְּדֻלָּה לְיוֹצֵר בְּרֵאשִׁית,
3	who has not made us like the nations of the lands	še-lo ʿaśanu ke-ḡoyei ha-ʾaraṣoṯ,	שֶׁלֹּא עָשָׂנוּ כְּגוֹיֵי הָאֲרָצוֹת,
4	nor placed us like the families of the earth;	we-lo śamanu ke-mišpeḥoṯ ha-ʾaḏama,	וְלֹא שָׂמָנוּ כְּמִשְׁפְּחוֹת הָאֲדָמָה.
5	who has not made our portion like theirs,	še-lo śam ḥelqenu ka-hem,	שֶׁלֹּא שָׂם חֶלְקֵנוּ כָּהֶם,
6	nor our destiny like all their multitudes.	we-ḡoralenu ke-ḵol hamonam.	וְגוֹרָלֵנוּ כְּכָל הֲמוֹנָם.
7	[For they worship vanity and emptiness,	[Še-hem mištaḥawim le-heḇel wa-riq,	[שֶׁהֵם מִשְׁתַּחֲוִים לְהֶבֶל וָרִיק,
8	and pray to a god who cannot save.]	u-miṯpallelim ʾel ʾel lo yošiaʿ.]	וּמִתְפַּלְלִים אֶל אֵל לֹא יוֹשִׁיעַ.]
9	But we [bend our knees,] bow in worship [and give thanks]	Wa-ʾanaḥnu [koreʿim u-]mištaḥawim [u-moḏim],	וַאֲנַחְנוּ [כֹּרְעִים וּ]מִשְׁתַּחֲוִים [וּמוֹדִים],
10	unto the Supreme King of kings,	lip̄nei Meleḵ, malḵei ha-melaḵim,	לִפְנֵי מֶלֶךְ מַלְכֵי הַמְּלָכִים
11	the Holy One, Blessed be He,	ha-Qaḏoš baruḵ Hu.	הַקָּדוֹשׁ בָּרוּךְ הוּא.
12	[who] extends the heavens and establishes the earth,	[Še-hu] noṭe šamayim, we-yoseḏ ʾareṣ,	[שֶׁהוּא] נוֹטֶה שָׁמַיִם וְיֹסֵד אָרֶץ,
13	whose throne of glory is in the heavens above,	u-mošaḇ yeqaro ba-šamayim mi-maʿal,	וּמוֹשַׁב יְקָרוֹ בַּשָּׁמַיִם מִמַּעַל,
14	and whose power's Presence is in the highest of heights.	u-šeḵinaṯ ʿuzzo be-ḡoḇhei meromim,	וּשְׁכִינַת עֻזּוֹ בְּגָבְהֵי מְרוֹמִים.
15	He is our God; [and] there is no other.	Hu ʾEloheinu, [we-]ʾein ʿoḏ [ʾaḫer],	הוּא אֱלֹהֵינוּ [וְ]אֵין עוֹד [אַחֵר],
16	Truly He is our King, [and] there is none else,	ʾemeṯ malkenu, [we-]ʾep̄es zulaṯo,	אֱמֶת מַלְכֵּנוּ [וְ]אֶפֶס זוּלָתוֹ.
17	as it is written in the / His Torah:	ka-kaṯuḇ ba-Tora / be-Ṯoraṯo:	כַּכָּתוּב בַּתּוֹרָה / בְּתוֹרָתוֹ:
18	"You shall know and take to heart this day	we-yaḏaʿta ha-yom, wa-hašeḇoṯa ʾel leḇaḇeḵa.	וְיָדַעְתָּ הַיּוֹם וַהֲשֵׁבֹתָ אֶל לְבָבֶךָ,
19	that the Lord is God,	Ki ʾAḏonay, Hu ha-ʾElohim,	כִּי יְהֹוָה הוּא הָאֱלֹהִים
20	in the heavens above	ba-šamayim mi-maʿal,	בַּשָּׁמַיִם מִמַּעַל
21	and on earth below. There is no other."	we-ʿal ha-ʾareṣ mi-taḥaṯ. ʾEin ʿoḏ.	וְעַל הָאָרֶץ מִתָּחַת. אֵין עוֹד.

Lines 7–8 are retained in Sephardic/Mizrahi, Italian, and some Hasidic and Israeli Ashkenazi siddurim, having been omitted from most European Ashkenazi printings since c. 1400 due to censorship (the Yemenite Baladi rite includes line 7 but omits line 8). The literal translation of the Ashkenazi and Italian phrasing in line 9 is "But we bend our knees and bow down and express thanks", whereas the Yemenite rite reads וַאֲנַחְנוּ כּוֹרְעִים וּמִשְׁתַּחֲוִים—Wa-ʾanaḥnu koreʿim u-mištaḥawim ("But we bend our knees and bow down"), and the Sephardic/Mizrahi tradition on weekdays shortens this line to וַאֲנַחְנוּ מִשְׁתַּחֲוִים—Wa-ʾanaḥnu mištaḥawim ("But we bow down"). In line 12, the Yemenite rite omits še-hu; in lines 15–16, the Sephardic rite adds [we-]ʾein ʿoḏ ʾaḥer and we-ʾep̄es zulaṯo; and in line 17, the Sephardic, Italian, and Yemenite rites read ba-Tora ("in the Torah") rather than Ashkenazi be-Ṯoraṯo ("in His Torah"). The quotation in lines 18–21 is Deuteronomy 4:39.

The second paragraph, ʿAl ken nekaveh, is recited daily in the Ashkenazi, Hasidic, and eastern Sephardic rites, as well as during the Rosh Hashanah Musaf service across all rites:

#	English translation	Transliteration	Hebrew
1	Therefore we hope in You, Lord our God,	ʿAl ken neqawwe leḵa, ʾAḏonay ʾEloheinu,	עַל כֵּן נְקַוֶּה לְּךָ יְהֹוָה אֱלֹהֵינוּ
2	to soon behold the splendor of Your might,	lirʾoṯ mehera be-ṯip̄ereṯ ʿuzzeḵa,	לִרְאוֹת מְהֵרָה בְּתִפְאַרֶת עֻזֶּךָ,
3	to remove abominations from the earth,	le-haʿaḇir gillulim min ha-ʾareṣ,	לְהַעֲבִיר גִּלּוּלִים מִן הָאָרֶץ,
4	and the idols will be utterly cut off,	we-ha-ʾelilim karoṯ yikkareṯun,	וְהָאֱלִילִים כָּרוֹת יִכָּרֵתוּן,
5	to perfect [establish] the world under the sovereignty of the Almighty,	le-ṯaqqen [le-ṯakken] ʿolam be-malḵuṯ Šadday,	לְתַקֵּן [לְתַכֵּן] עוֹלָם בְּמַלְכוּת שַׁדַּי,
6	and all flesh will call upon Your name,	we-ḵol benei ḇaśar yiqreʾu ḇi-šmeḵa,	וְכָל בְּנֵי בָשָׂר יִקְרְאוּ בִשְׁמֶךָ,
7	to turn toward You all the wicked of the earth.	le-hap̄noṯ ʾeleḵa kol rišʿei ʾareṣ.	לְהַפְנוֹת אֵלֶיךָ כָּל רִשְׁעֵי אָרֶץ.
8	Let all the inhabitants of the world recognize and know	Yakkiru we-yeḏeʿu kol yošeḇei ṯeḇel,	יַכִּירוּ וְיֵדְעוּ כָּל יוֹשְׁבֵי תֵבֵל,
9	that to You every knee must bend, every tongue must swear.	ki leḵa tiḵraʿ kol bereḵ, tiššaḇaʿ kol lašon.	כִּי לְךָ תִּכְרַע כָּל בֶּרֶךְ, תִּשָּׁבַע כָּל לָשׁוֹן.
10	Before You, Lord our God, they will bow and fall,	Lep̄aneḵa ʾAḏonay ʾEloheinu yiḵreʿu we-yippolu,	לְפָנֶיךָ יְהֹוָה אֱלֹהֵינוּ יִכְרְעוּ וְיִפֹּלוּ,
11	and to the glory of Your name they will give honor;	we-li-ḵḇoḏ šimḵa yeqar yittenu,	וְלִכְבוֹד שִׁמְךָ יְקָר יִתֵּנוּ,
12	and they will all accept the yoke of Your kingdom,	wi-yqabbelu ḵullam ʾeṯ ʿol malḵuṯeḵa,	וִיקַבְּלוּ כֻלָּם אֶת עֹל מַלְכוּתֶךָ,
13	[and give You the crown of sovereignty,] and You will reign over them soon forever and ever.	[we-yittenu leḵa keṯer meluḵa,] we-ṯimloḵ ʿaleihem mehera le-ʿolam wa-ʿeḏ.	[וְיִתְּנוּ לְךָ כֶּתֶר מְלוּכָה,] וְתִמְלֹךְ עֲלֵיהֶם מְהֵרָה לְעוֹלָם וָעֶד.
14	For the kingdom is Yours, and to all eternity You will reign in glory,	Ki ha-malḵuṯ šelleḵa hi u-le-ʿolemei ʿaḏ timloḵ be-ḵaḇoḏ,	כִּי הַמַּלְכוּת שֶׁלְּךָ הִיא וּלְעוֹלְמֵי עַד תִּמְלוֹךְ בְּכָבוֹד,
15	as it is written in Your Torah: "The Lord will reign forever and ever."	ka-kaṯuḇ be-Ṯoraṯeḵa: ʾAḏonay yimloḵ le-ʿolam wa-ʿeḏ.	כַּכָּתוּב בְּתוֹרָתֶךָ: יְהֹוָה יִמְלֹךְ לְעוֹלָם וָעֶד.
16	And it is said: "And the Lord will be King over all the earth;	We-neʾemar: we-hayah ʾAḏonay le-Meleḵ ʿal kol ha-ʾareṣ,	וְנֶאֱמַר: וְהָיָה יְהֹוָה לְמֶלֶךְ עַל כָּל הָאָרֶץ,
17	on that day the Lord will be One and His name One."	ba-yom ha-hu yihyeh ʾAḏonay ʾeḥaḏ u-šemo ʾeḥaḏ.	בַּיּוֹם הַהוּא יִהְיֶה יְהֹוָה אֶחָד וּשְׁמוֹ אֶחָד.

In line 5 of the second paragraph, Ashkenazi and Sephardic texts read לְתַקֵּן—le-ṯaqqen ("to perfect/repair"; see Tikkun olam), whereas the Yemenite rite and early manuscripts (including the Siddur of Saadia Gaon) read לְתַכֵּן—le-ṯakken ("to establish firmly"). In line 13, the bracketed phrase we-yittenu leḵa keṯer meluḵa ("and give You the crown of sovereignty") appears in the Sephardic High Holiday liturgy and in some eastern Sephardic daily siddurim. The biblical quotations in lines 15 and 16–17 are Exodus 15:18 and Zechariah 14:9 (after which Ashkenazi siddurim customarily append Proverbs 3:25, Isaiah 8:10, and Isaiah 46:4).

== Use in the synagogue ==
Aleinu is recited with all the congregants standing. One reason for this is because it is a declaration of faith that should be done with great fear and awe, but also that the first and last letters of the prayer spell עד ed ("witness") and it is appropriate for the praying person as a witness of God to stand when testifying.

The original context of the prayer was as part of the middle paragraphs of the Amidah in the mussaf (additional) service on Rosh Hashanah, and more specifically in the passage known as Malchuyot (kingships of God). In this context, it includes both paragraphs of the prayer. The first paragraph is also included at the equivalent point in the liturgy for Yom Kippur during the chazzan's repetition but not during the silent prayer.

In the Middle Ages, varying customs emerged of reciting the first paragraph every day, at the end of either the morning service alone or of all the prayer services for the day. In the 16th century, the kabbalist Hayyim ben Joseph Vital, recording the opinions of Isaac Luria, ruled that both paragraphs should be included in all services, and should end with the verse "on that day the Lord shall be one and His Name one". This has been accepted in almost all communities except for the Spanish and Portuguese Jews, who retain the "short Alenu". The custom, according to some North African prayer books, is to recite the second paragraph only at the conclusion of weekday morning services.

In some Ashkenazic communities, Aleinu is not recited at Mincha when it is followed immediately by Maariv, as this is not considered the end of the service. Furthermore, in the Italian and Yemenite rites, Aleinu is never recited in Mincha.

In the daily and Sabbath services, when the line (numbered above as line 9; here translated literally) "But we bend our knees and bow" is recited, many have the custom to flex their knees and then bend from the waist, straightening up by the time the words "before (lif'nei) the King of kings of kings" are reached. But during the repetition on the High Holy Days of Rosh Hashana and Yom Kippur, the worshipper will not merely flex and bend but will actually get down on his knees at those words, and many congregants will prostrate themselves on the floor (in those synagogues with sufficient floor space).

In Orthodox and Conservative congregations, the Torah Ark remains closed while it is recited (except on Rosh Hashana and Yom Kippur, when the Ark is opened), but in some Reform congregations, the Ark is opened whenever Aleinu is recited. In most Sefardic congregations, as well as in the Ashkenazi traditions of Frankfurt and Mainz, Aleinu is not followed by the Mourner's Kaddish (because, variously, Aleinu was whispered to avoid antagonizing the Christian authorities, or because Aleinu is not a reading from Scripture), elsewhere it is. The Sefardic congregations that recite Kaddish afterward insert Psalm 27 immediately beforehand.

== Censored passage ==
Referring the lines above numbered 7 & 8:

The earlier form of this prayer contains an additional sentence:

For they worship vanity and emptiness, and pray to a god who cannot save.

This sentence is built from two quotations from the Bible, specifically from the Book of Isaiah, Isaiah 30:7, "For the help of Egypt shall be (הבל וריק) vain and empty ..."; and Isaiah 45:20. "... No foreknowledge had they who carry their wooden images (וּמתפּללים אל־אל לא יוֹשׁיע) and pray to a God who cannot give success." (New JPS) The line is still set out in full in Sephardi and Italian prayer books, but was omitted in most of the older printed Ashkenazi prayer books. In some older editions of other rites (e.g., the Maḥzor Aram Soba, 1560, as well as some editions of the Ashkenazic prayer book) a blank line was left in the printing, leaving it free for the missing line to be filled in handwriting. In many current Orthodox Jewish siddurim (prayer books) this line has been restored, and the practice of reciting it has increased.

Although the above text, which includes the censored verse, is taken from the 2009 Koren Sacks Siddur, edited by Rabbi Jonathan Sacks (in that edition the censored verse is printed without any distinguishing marks), the 2007 4th edition of The Authorised Daily Prayer Book of the United Hebrew Congregations of the Commonwealth, edited by the same Rabbi Sacks, omits the censored verse completely and without any indication that such a verse ever existed.

=== History of the censorship ===
Approximately a century after this prayer was incorporated into the daily liturgy, circa 1300, an apostate Jew, known as Pesach Peter, denounced it as a secret anti-Christian slur on the grounds that the word וריק—varik, "and emptiness"—had, in gematria (Hebrew numerology) the value of 316, the same as ישׁו—Jesus. In vain did the rabbis defend the sentence on the grounds that the expression came from the Book of Isaiah, or that the whole prayer came from Joshua, and therefore must predate Christianity, or, if the prayer was attributed to Rav, living in 3rd-century Babylonia (Persia), that he never encountered a Christian.—It probably did not help that at roughly the same time a rabbinic commentary on the prayers, Arugat haBosem by Abraham ben Azriel, made the point that, in gematria, "vanity and emptiness" had the same value as ישׁו ומחמט—"Jesus and Mohammed". As a result of this, in various places the Christian authorities censored the sentence, usually omitting it.

Circa 1938, Herbert Lowe, the Reader in Rabbinics at Cambridge University, wrote: "No Jew who recites it ever thinks of it in relation to Christians: the chief thought in his mind is the noble conclusion. It is, in fact, a universalist pronouncement of the Messianic hope, and with this idea every service concludes."

As a result of this censorship, a curious practice arose - it may have predated the censorship, but thereafter acquired encouragement as a form of resistance - that where the word "emptiness" occurred - or should have occurred - the individual was supposed to spit (on the floor), on the pretext that "emptiness" is very similar to the Hebrew word for "spittle". This practice was mentioned by the early 15th century. When, for example, the accusations about this verse were revived in Prussia in 1703, the government (in Berlin) enacted that the controversial verse should be omitted altogether and that spitting or recoiling was forbidden and that the prayer would be recited aloud "in unison" by the whole congregation (to make sure nobody was surreptitiously reciting the verse) and that government inspectors would be posted in synagogues to ensure compliance. Apparently no one was ever prosecuted for violating this edict. In some other places, the practice of spitting persisted (or at least was remembered), and there arose a Yiddish expression for someone arriving very late for services (perhaps just to recite the Mourners' Kaddish, which follows Aleinu), "He arrives at the spitting" (קומען צום אױסשפּײַען kumen tsum oysshpayen).

In the daily synagogue services, the Torah Ark is closed while Aleinu is recited, but on Rosh Hashana, when Aleinu is recited during the Mussaf Amidah, the Ark is opened when Aleinu is begun, closed momentarily when the controversial verse was recited (presumably to shield the Torah scrolls from hearing a description of heathen practices) and then opened again as soon as that verse was finished, and then closed again when Aleinu is finished. Even after the controversial verse was deleted from the liturgy, owing to Christian censorship, the Ark was momentarily closed although nothing was recited at that moment, as a relic and reminder of the censored verse.

Conservative Rabbi Reuven Hammer comments on the excised sentence:

Originally the text read that God has not made us like the nations who "bow down to nothingness and vanity, and pray to an impotent god." ... In the Middle Ages these words were censored, since the church believed they were an insult to Christianity. Omitting them tends to give the impression that the Aleinu teaches that we are both different and better than others. The actual intent is to say that we are thankful that God has enlightened us so that, unlike the pagans, we worship the true God and not idols. There is no inherent superiority in being Jewish, but we do assert the superiority of monotheistic belief over paganism. Although paganism still exists today, we are no longer the only ones to have a belief in one God.

In 1656, Manasseh ben Israel reported that the Sultan Selim (presumably Selim II, 1524–74), having read the uncensored text of Aleinu in Turkish translation, declared: "Truly this prayer is sufficient for all purposes. There is no need of any other."

=== Restoration ===
Some Orthodox rabbinical authorities, prominently the 19th-century Rabbi Moshe Yehoshua Leib Diskin (Maharil Diskin, died 1898), have argued that the disputed phrase should be recited in communities that previously omitted it.

== Other variations ==
In several communities, changes have been introduced, especially in the opening lines of the text, to make it less controversial and extreme in its appearance of ethnocentrism. In some instances these changes have taken the form of less-than-literal translations of the traditional Hebrew into the local language.

For example, in the Italian ritual, "they bow down" was changed to the past tense, "they used to bow down", and "vanity and emptiness" was changed to לאלילים—"idols", so the whole verse refers to ancient idol worship.

There was, evidently, an experimental amendment to the preceding verse in one or more Sephardic prayerbooks: "... He has not made us like some nations of other countries ..." But this amendment was abandoned. The past tense formulation ("worshipped" and "bowed down") appears in the translation in the London Sephardic prayer books, though the Hebrew retains the present tense.

More far-reaching changes have been made to the wording of this prayer in Conservative and Reform prayer books. For example, the British Reform version borrows words from the blessings over the Torah, and begins "It is our duty to praise the Ruler of all, to recognise the greatness of the Creator of first things, who has chosen us from all peoples by giving us Torah. Therefore we bend low and submit." Reconstructionist Judaism changes the lines which refer to the chosen people to read, "who gave us teachings of truth and implanted eternal life within us." The opening of Aleinu is frequent site for liturgical creativity for authors of all stripes.

Although the second paragraph of the standard text of Aleinu today includes the phrase "le-taqen olam" לתקן עולם (to fix the world), some scholars suggest that the original text had "le-taken olam" לתכן עולם (spelled with a kaf, not a quf). The "kaf" reading is in the text of Siddur Rav Saadiah Gaon, in the Yemenite ritual, and in fragments from the Cairo Genizah. The verb t-q-n can mean to fix, repair, prepare, or establish; t-k-n would more strictly mean to establish.

== See also ==
- List of Jewish prayers and blessings
- Jewish services
