= Havdalah =

Jewish religious ceremony after Shabbat ends

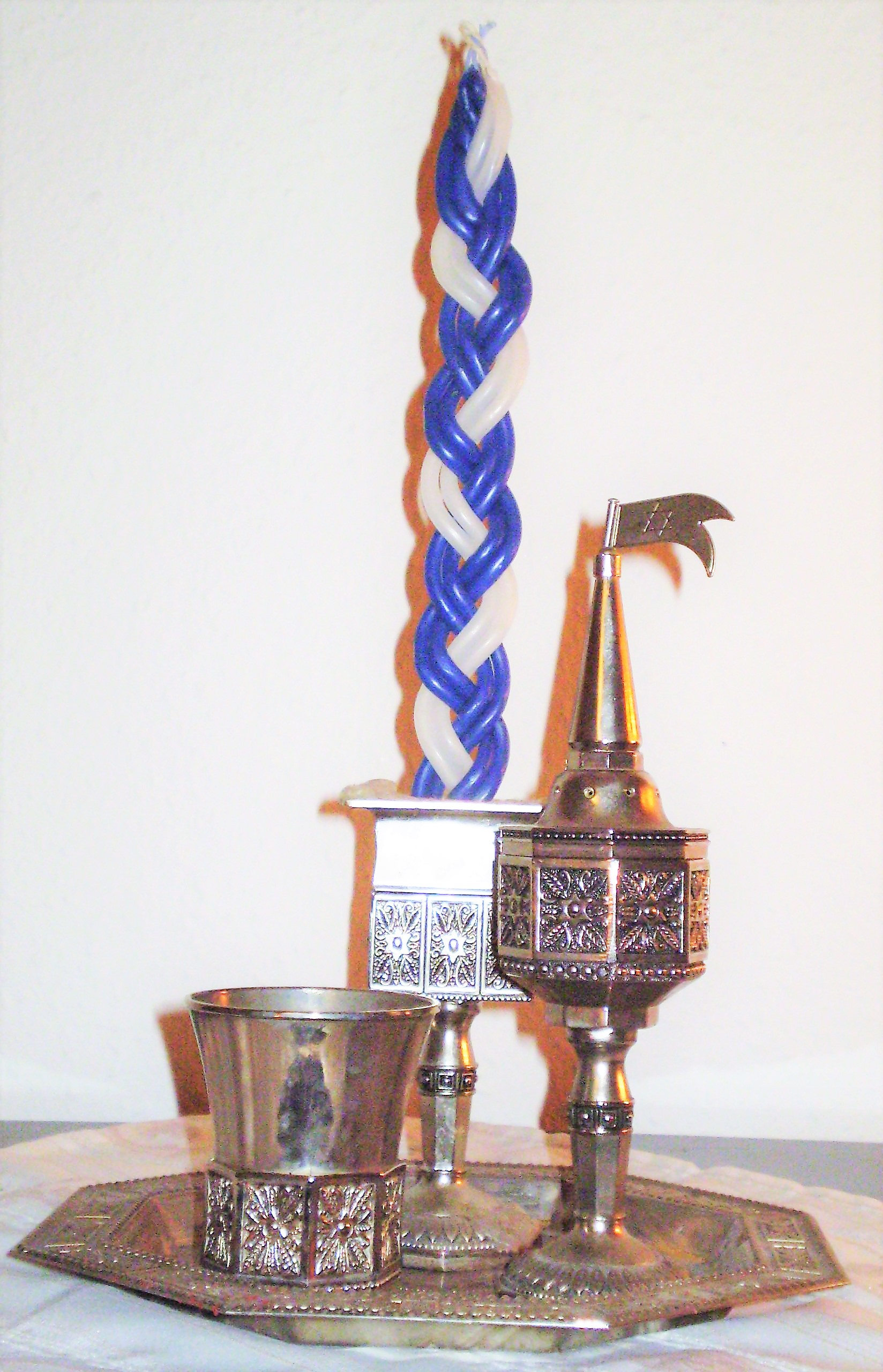
Havdalah candle, kiddush cup, and spice box

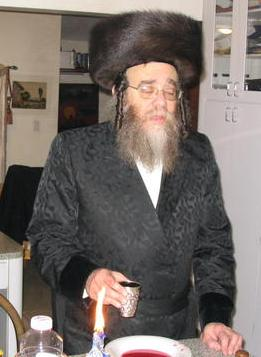
Grand Rabbi Judah Wolff Kornreich, the Shidlovtzer Rebbe, reciting Havdalah

Havdalah (Hebrew: הַבְדָּלָה, romanized: haḇdālā, lit. 'separation', Jewish Babylonian Aramaic: אַבְדַּלְתָּא, romanized: aḇdaltā) is a Jewish religious ceremony that marks the symbolic end of Shabbat and ushers in the new week. The ritual involves lighting a special candle with several wicks, blessing a cup of wine, and smelling sweet spices (Hebrew: בְּשָׂמִים, romanized: bǝśāmim, lit. '"besamim"'). Shabbat ends on Saturday night after the appearance of three stars in the sky. If one forgot or was otherwise not able to recite Havdalah earlier, it may be performed as late as sunset of the Tuesday following Shabbat; however, when it is recited after Saturday night the blessings of the spices and candle are omitted, and only the blessings on the wine and the havdalah itself are recited. Havdalah is also recited at the conclusion of the biblical holidays.

== Customs ==
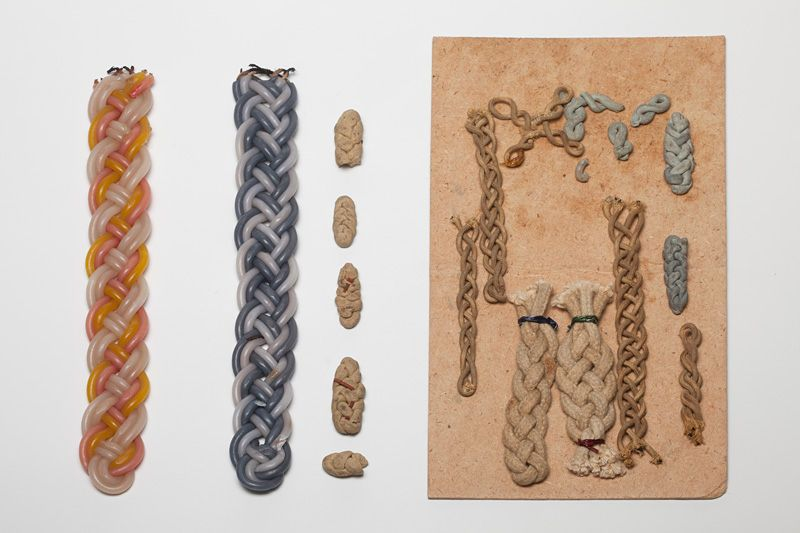
Havdalah candles in the collection of the Jewish Museum of Switzerland

Like kiddush, havdalah is recited over a cup of kosher wine or grape juice, although other important beverages (chamar ha-medinah) may be used if wine or grape juice are not available.

Spices, called besamim in Hebrew, often stored in an artistically-decorative spice container in order to beautify and honor the mitzvah, are handed around so that everyone can smell the fragrance. In many Sefardic and Mizrahi communities, branches of aromatic plants are used for this purpose, while Ashkenazi Jews have traditionally used cloves. A special braided havdalah candle with more than one wick is lit, and a blessing is recited. If a special havdalah candle is not available, two candles can be used, and the two flames joined when reciting the blessing.

Either right before or right after reciting the words "Barukh atah Adonai Eloheinu melekh ha'olam, bo're m'orei ha'esh," it is customary for the participants to hold their hands up to the candle and gaze at the reflection of the light in their fingernails. This custom was first recorded in MS ex-Montefiore 134 (c. 1275) and the Or Zarua II (c. 1300).

At the conclusion of Havdalah, some or all of the leftover wine is poured into a small dish and the candle is extinguished in it, as a sign that the candle was lit solely for the mitzvah of Havdalah; some pour directly onto the candle. Based on Psalms 19:9, "the commandment of the Lord is clear, enlightening the eyes," some Jews dip a finger into the leftover wine and touch their eyes or pockets with it. Because it was used for a mitzvah, the wine is considered a "segulah," or good omen.

After the Havdalah ceremony, it is customary to sing "Eliyahu Hanavi" ("Elijah the Prophet") and/or HaMavdil Bein Kodesh LeChol ("Who separates Holy from ordinary/weekday"), and to bless one another with shavua tov (Hebrew) or a gute vokh (Yiddish), meaning "Have a good week".

Havdalah is also recited at the conclusion of the following biblical holidays: Rosh Hashanah; Yom Kippur; the first days (first day in Israel) of Sukkot; Simchat Torah; Passover (Pesach), both its first and last days; and Shavuot. It is omitted, however, if the Sabbath falls immediately after the Festival. At the conclusion of a Festival that is not at the conclusion of the Sabbath, on the blessings over the wine and the blessing separating the holy from the everyday, but the spices and the havdalah candle are omitted. At the conclusion of Yom Kippur, when the blessing over the candle is recited, if it was lit from a candle that was lit all of Yom Kippur; when Yom Kippur falls on a weekday, the blessing on spices is not recited, and when it falls on the Sabbath customs differ.

When a major holiday follows Shabbat, the Havdalah service is recited as part of the holiday kiddush and the blessing over spices is not said. The special braided Havdalah candle is not used since it may not be extinguished after the service, but rather the blessing is recited over the festival candles. The prayer "distinguishes holiness from the everyday" is changed to "distinguishes holiness from holiness" signifying that the holiness of the holiday is of a lesser degree than the holiness of the concluded Shabbat.

== Significance ==
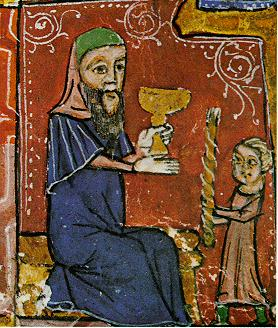
Observing the Havdalah ritual, 14th-century Spain

Havdalah is intended to require a person to use all five senses: feel the cup, smell the spices, see the flame of the candle, hear the blessings and taste the wine.

Following a normal Shabbat, the order of the prayers corresponds to the acrostic יבנ"ה Yavneh. This acrostic consists of the initials Yayin (wine), Besamim (spices), Ner (candle), and Havdalah (the Havdalah prayer).

The order of elements when Havdalah is combined with kiddush (e.g., on a Saturday night that is Yom Tov ("holiday", literally "Good Day") is known by the acrostic יקנה"ז Yaknhaz. This acrostic consists of the initials Yayin (wine), Kiddush HaYom (blessing the day), Ner (candle), Havdala (the Havdala blessing) and Zman (time, i.e. shehechiyanu). However, when the eighth day of Passover (outside of Israel) falls on Saturday night, the order is יקנ"ה Yakneh, since shehechiyanu is never recited on the last days of Passover.

Near the Qaddesh section in some Ashkenazic versions of the Haggadah (e.g. Mantoba 1560, Prague 1526, Venice 1609 and the Goldschmidt Edition), there is a picture of a hunter chasing a hare. This picture is a useful mnemonic for the acrostic יקנה"ז Yaknhaz or Yaknehoz, which resembles a Yiddish or German phrase that sounds similar. The Yiddish phrase יאָגן א האָז yogn a hoz means "to hunt a hare!" (cf. Yiddish יאָג דעם האָז yog dem hoz). The colloquial German sentence Jag 'en Has' [jakenhaz] also means "hunt a/the hare!" (cf. German Jag einen/den Hasen!).

== Blessings ==
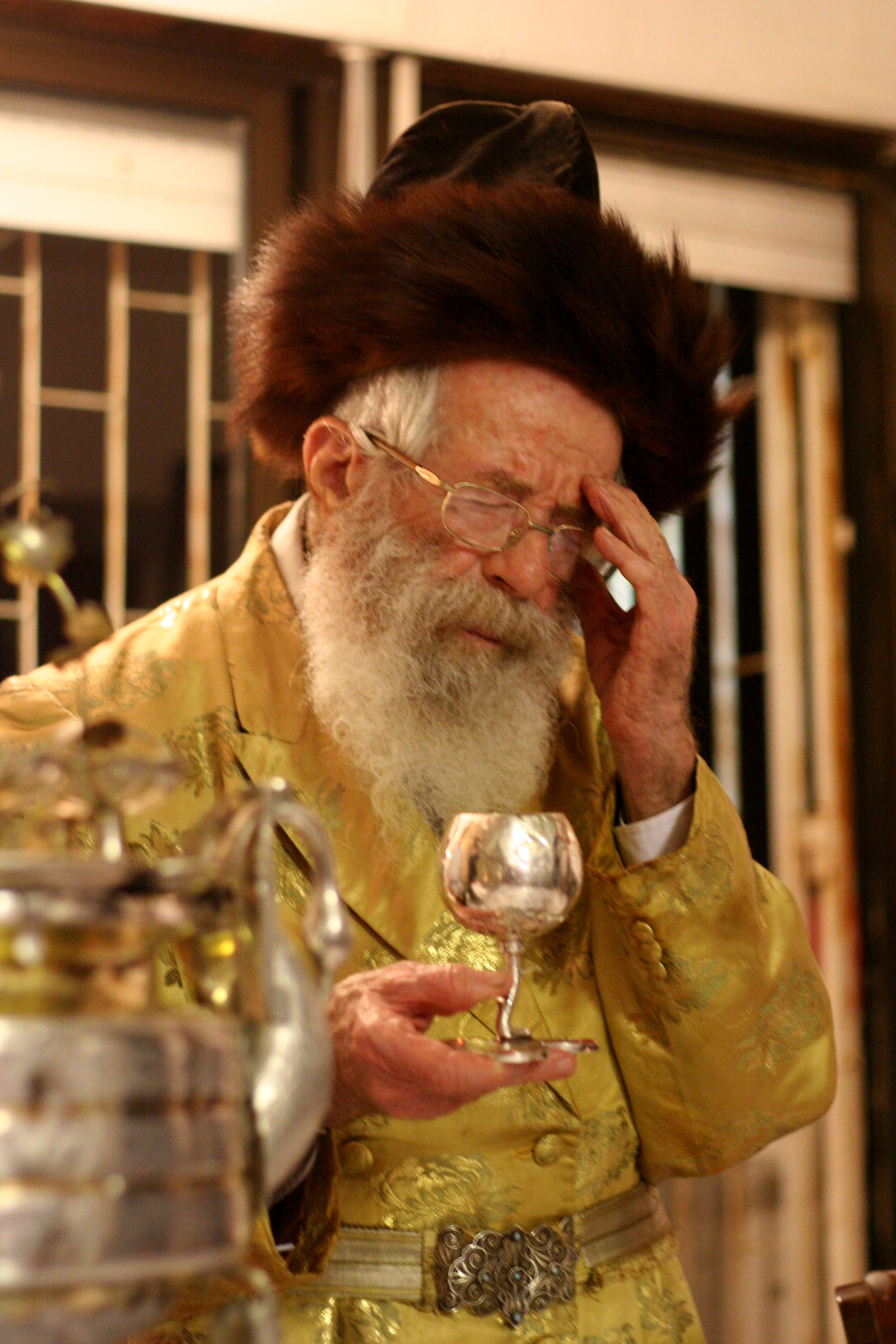
Pashkaner Rebbe, Yisrael Friedman, reciting Havdalah after Pesach

The verses recited before Havdalah differ by community. The introductory verses in the Ashkenazic version (beginning הנה אל, Hinei El) are taken from the biblical books of Isaiah, Psalms and Esther. In the Sephardic liturgy, the introduction begins with the words ראשון לציון, Rishon L'tsion and consists of biblical verses describing God giving light and success interspersed with later liturgical prose. The Italian Nusach has a third selection of verses. The verses are omitted at the conclusion of Festivals (except when coinciding with the Sabbath), when Havdalah is not recited immediately at the conclusion of the Sabbath (including when Tisha Bav falls on Sunday, and Havdalah is delayed until Sunday night at the conclusion of Tisha Bav), and in the Ashkenazic rite they are omitted also when Havdalah is recited as part of the Synagogue service. The four blessings over the wine, spices, candle and praising God for separation between holy and profane are virtually identical between the traditions. The phrase בין ישראל לעמים, bein Yisrael l'amim 'between Israel and the nations' is based on Leviticus 20:26. In Reconstructionist Judaism, however, the phrase is omitted, as part of founder Mordechai Kaplan's rejection of the Biblical idea of chosenness. Modern tunes for Havdalah are based on melodies by Shlomo Carlebach, Neshama Carlebach and Debbie Friedman.

The Ashkenazi liturgy for havdala after a festival or Shabbat is as follows:

Blessing	Hebrew	Transliteration	English
The following paragraph omitted by most communities at all times other than the conclusion of Shabbat.
Introductory Verses	הִנֵּה אֵ‑ל יְשׁוּעָתִי, אֶבְטַח וְלֹא אֶפְחָד, כִּי עָזִּי וְזִמְרָת יָ‑הּ ה', וַיְהִי לִי לִישׁוּעָה. וּשְׁאַבְתֶּם מַֽיִם בְּשָׂשׂוֹן, מִמַּעַיְנֵי הַיְשׁוּעָה. לַה' הַיְשׁוּעָה, עַל עַמְּךָ בִרְכָתֶֽךָ סֶּֽלָה. ה' צְבָ‑אוֹת עִמָּֽנוּ, מִשְׂגָּב לָנוּ אֱ-לֹהֵי יַעֲקֹב סֶֽלָה. (ה' צְבָ‑אוֹת, אַשְרֵי אָדָם בֹּטֵֽחַ בָּךְ. ה' הוֹשִֽׁיעָה, הַמֶּֽלֶךְ יַעֲנֵֽנוּ בְיוֹם קָרְאֵֽנוּ.) לַיְּהוּדִים הָיְתָה אוֹרָה וְשִׂמְחָה וְשָׂשׂוֹן וִיקָר. כֵּן תִּהְיֶה לָּֽנוּ. כּוֹס יְשׁוּעוֹת אֶשָּׂא, וּבְשֵׁם ה' אֶקְרָא	Hinei El yeshuati, evtakh velo efkhad, ki ozi v'zimrat Yah, Adonai vayehi li liyeshuah. U'shavtem mayim besasson mima’anei hayeshuah. La’Adonai hayeshuah, al amkha virchatecha, selah. Adonai Tzeva’ot imanu, misgav lanu, Elohay Ya’akov, selah. (Adonai Tzeva’ot, ashrei adam botayakh bakh. Adonai hoshi’ah, hamelekh ya’anaynu veyom karaynu.) Layehudim hayetah orah vesimcha vesason vikar. Kein tehiyeh lanu. Kos yeshuot esa uveshaym Adonai ekrah.	Behold, God is my savior, I will trust God and not be afraid, for my strong faith and song of praise for God will be my salvation. You will draw water joyously from the wellsprings of salvation. Salvation is the God’s; may Your blessing rest upon Your people. God of the heavenly armies is with us; the Lord of Ya’akov is a fortress protecting us. (God of the heavenly armies, happy is the individual who trusts You. God, redeem us! The King will answer us on the day we call God.) The Jews had light, happiness, joy and honor; may we have the same. I will raise the cup of salvation and call out in the name of the God.
On wine	בָּרוּךְ אַתָּה ה', אֱ‑לֹהֵינוּ מֶלֶךְ הָעוֹלָם, בּוֹרֵא פְּרִי הַגָּפֶן/הַגֶּפֶן.	Barukh ata Adonai Eloheinu, Melekh ha'olam, bo're p'ri hagafen/hagefen.	Blessed are You, LORD our God, King of the universe, Who creates the fruit of the vine.
At the conclusion of Yom Kippur one continues with the blessing on the candle. At all other times except for the conclusion of Shabbat, one continues with the blessing on separation. At the conclusion of Festival coinciding with the conclusion of Shabbat, one does it like the conclusion of Shabbat; however, at the conclusion of Yom Kippur coinciding with the conclusion of Shabbat, customs differ as to whether to make this blessing.
On spices	בָּרוּךְ אַתָּה ה', אֱ‑לֹהֵינוּ מֶלֶךְ הָעוֹלָם, בּוֹרֵא מִינֵי בְשָׂמִים.	Barukh ata Adonai Eloheinu, melekh ha'olam, bo're minei v'samim.	Blessed are You, LORD our God, King of the universe, Who creates varieties of spices.
The spices are then passed around and smelled by those present.
On the candle	בָּרוּךְ אַתָּה ה' אֱ‑לֹהֵינוּ מֶלֶךְ הָעוֹלָם. בּוֹרֵא מְאוֹרֵי הָאֵשׁ.	Barukh ata Adonai Eloheinu, melekh ha'olam, bo're m'orei ha'esh.	Blessed are You, LORD our God, King of the universe, Who creates the lights of the fire.
The candle is held up in the air and those present look at the reflection of the light on their fingernails. According to some customs, this is done immediately before reciting this blessing.
On separation	בָּרוּךְ אַתָּה ה' אֱ‑לֹהֵינוּ מֶלֶךְ הָעוֹלָם, הַמַּבְדִּיל בֵּין קֹדֶשׁ לְחוֹל, בֵּין אוֹר לְחשֶׁךְ, בֵּין יִשְׂרָאֵל לָעַמִּים, בֵּין יוֹם הַשְּׁבִיעִי לְשֵׁשֶׁת יְמֵי הַמַּעֲשֶׂה: בָּרוּךְ אַתָּה ה', הַמַּבְדִּיל בֵּין קֹדֶשׁ לְחוֹל:	Barukh ata Adonai Eloheinu, melekh ha'olam, ha'mavdil bein kodesh l'hol, bein or l'hoshekh, bein yisra'el la'amim, bein yom ha'sh'vi'i l'sheshet y'mei ha'ma'a'se. Barukh ata Adonai, ha'mavdil bein kodesh l'hol.	Blessed are You, LORD our God, King of the universe, Who distinguishes between the sacred and the secular, between light and dark, between Israel and the nations, between the seventh day and the six days of labor. Blessed are You, LORD, Who distinguishes between the sacred and the secular.
The person who recited the blessings now drinks the wine.

== See also ==
- Shabbat
- Special Shabbat
