= Motza'ei Shabbat =

In Judaism, the time immediately following Shabbat

The term Motza'ei Shabbat (Hebrew: מוצאי שבת—literally, the going out of the Sabbath) in Judaism refers to the time in the evening immediately following Shabbat, that is Saturday night. It is a time when, following one's declaration of the intention to end Shabbat, it is permissible to resume weekday activities that are prohibited on Shabbat. This may occur no earlier than when three "small" stars appear in the sky. There are varying opinions as to how much time elapses following sunset until this occurs. This difference of opinions results in different ways to predetermine the fixed time when the Shabbat will end on a given Saturday night. The time varies, depending on one's geographic location and the time of year.

Regardless of location, the time that Shabbat ends, which is approximately one hour later than the time for candle lighting the day before, fluctuates approximately four hours throughout the calendar year and by up to 17 minutes from one week to the next (or by more than an hour if the time has changed during the previous week).

There are three ways one can declare the end of Shabbat in order to be allowed to resume activities forbidden during Shabbat:

1. Reciting Ata Honantanu: This special paragraph is added to the Amidah during Maariv on Saturday evening, and is generally recited by men to end Shabbat
2. Reciting Baruch Hamavdil: The verse "Baruch Hamavdil Bein Kodesh LeHol" is generally recited by women, who traditionally do not recite the Maariv prayer
3. Havdalah: Havdalah is a required ritual on Motza'ei Shabbat. Reciting or listening to Havdalah defines the end of Shabbat. But one who lights the Havdalah candle or else wishes to perform any activity otherwise prohibited during Shabbat must declare an end to Shabbat by one of the above two methods.

It is permitted to resume activities that are prohibited on Shabbat after any one of the three methods.
