= Psalm 33 =

Biblical psalm

- "Rejoice in the LORD, O ye righteous"
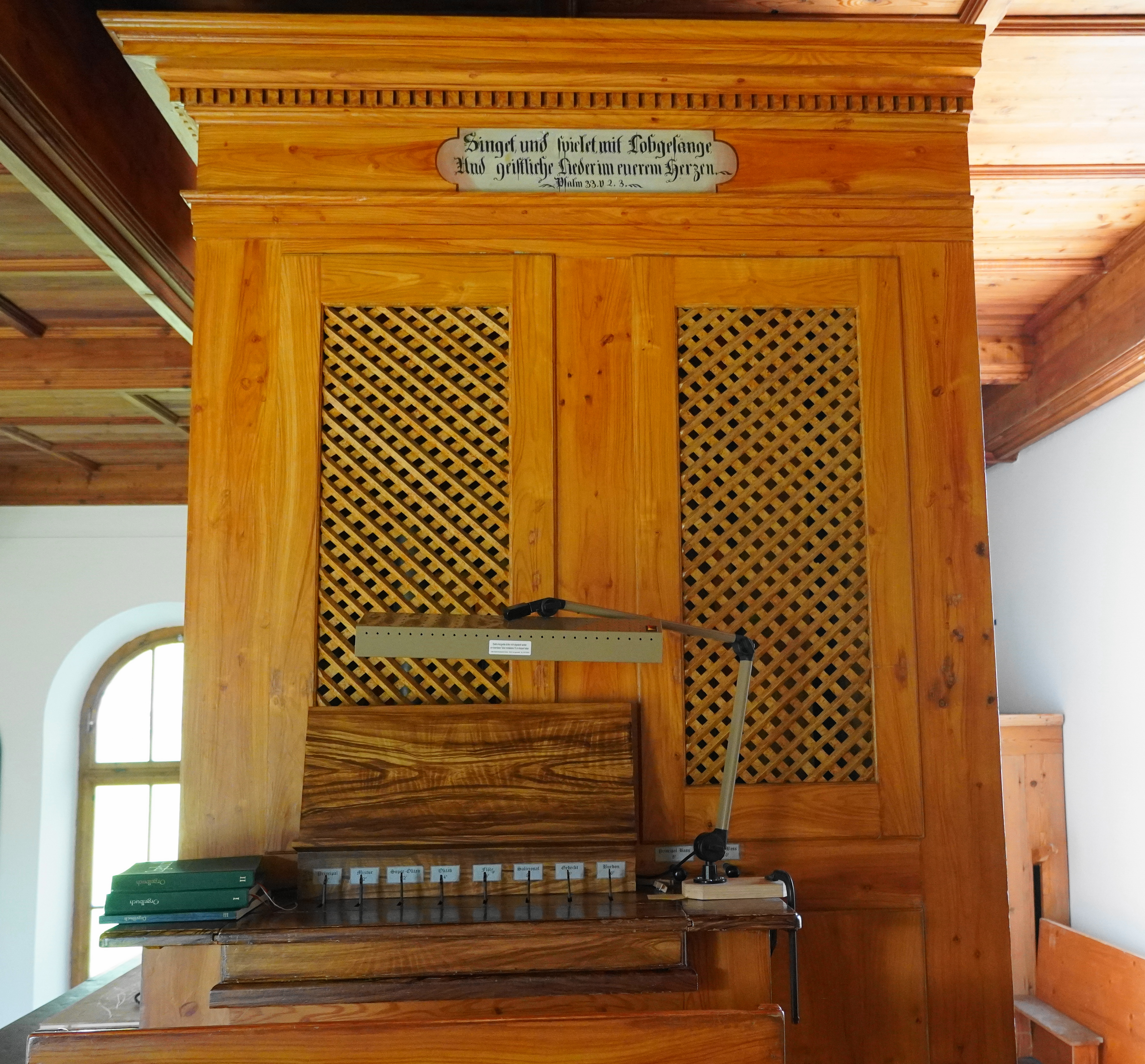
- Verse 2 in German at the organ of an Austrian Protestant church
- Other name: "Exultate iusti in Domino"
- Text: attributed to King David
- Language: Hebrew (original)

Psalm 33
- ← Psalm 32 Psalm 34 →
- Book: Book of Psalms
- Hebrew Bible part: Ketuvim
- Order in the Hebrew part: 1
- Category: Sifrei Emet
- Christian Bible part: Old Testament
- Order in the Christian part: 19

Psalm 33 is the 33rd psalm of the Book of Psalms, beginning in English in the King James Version: "Rejoice in the LORD, O ye righteous: for praise is comely for the upright". The Book of Psalms is part of the third section of the Hebrew Bible, and a book of the Christian Old Testament. In the slightly different numbering system used in the Greek Septuagint and Latin Vulgate translations of the Bible, this psalm is Psalm 32. In Latin, it is known by the incipit, "Exultate iusti in Domino". Its purpose is to praise "the Sovereignty of the Lord in Creation and History".

Psalm 33 is used in both Jewish and Christian liturgies. It has been set to music.

== Content ==
In the International Critical Commentary series, Charles and Emilie Briggs described it as follows: "Ps. 33 is a song of praise. (1) A call to worship in the temple with song, music, and shouting (v.^{1–3}), because of the righteousness and kindness of Yahweh (v.^{4–5}). (2) All mankind are called to fear Yahweh, the creator of all things, and disposer of all nations (v.^{6–10}). (3) Yahweh from His heavenly throne inspects all mankind (v.^{13–15}); and victory is not due to armies or warriors (v.^{16–17}). (4) He delivereth those who fear Him (v.^{18–19}); therefore his people long for Him, are glad in him, and trust in His name for victory (v.^{20–22}). A gloss praises the plans of Yahweh as everlastingly secure, and also the happiness of His people (v.^{11–12})."

Psalm 33 does not contain an ascription to any particular author in the Hebrew text, although the Septuagint ascribes it to David. Some manuscripts join it with Psalm 32. The Briggses suggest that it dates to the time of the Maccabees.

== Uses ==
=== New Testament ===
Verse 6, "By the word of the Lord the heavens were made", is alluded to in Hebrews 11:3: "By faith we know the universe was made by God's command".

=== Judaism ===
- Is recited in its entirety during the Pesukei Dezimra on Shabbat, Yom Tov, and - in many communities - on Hoshana Rabbah.
- Is recited by some during Tashlikh.
- Is recited on days of Fast of Behav in some traditions.
- Verse 1 is part of Shochein Ad.
- Verse 10 is the tenth verse of Yehi Kivod in Pesukei Dezimra. Verse 11 is the twelfth verse of Yehi Kivod. Verse 9 is the thirteenth verse of Yehi Kivod.
- Verse 15 is found in Tractate Rosh Hashanah 1:2.
- Verses 20–22 are the second thru fourth verses of Hoshia Et Amecha of Pesukei Dezimra.
- Verse 22 is part of the final paragraph of Tachanun and Baruch Hashem L'Olam during Maariv.

=== Book of Common Prayer ===
In the Church of England's Book of Common Prayer, this psalm is appointed to be read on the evening of the sixth day of the month.

== Musical settings ==
Heinrich Schütz wrote a setting of a paraphrase of the psalm in German, "Freut euch des Herrn, ihr Christen all", SWV 130, for the Becker Psalter, published first in 1628. Carl Loewe composed a setting in German for male a cappella choir, published in Dresden in 1845. Alan Hovhaness set portions of this psalm, along with Psalms 146 and 150, in his opus 222 Praise the Lord with Psaltery.

== Text ==
The following table shows the Hebrew text of the Psalm with vowels, alongside the Koine Greek text in the Septuagint and the English translation from the King James Version. Note that the meaning can slightly differ between these versions, as the Septuagint and the Masoretic Text come from different textual traditions. (Note: A 1917 translation directly from Hebrew to English by the Jewish Publication Society can be found here or here, and an 1844 translation directly from the Septuagint by L. C. L. Brenton can be found here. Both translations are in the public domain.) In the Septuagint, this psalm is numbered Psalm 32.

#	Hebrew	English	Greek
1	רַנְּנ֣וּ צַ֭דִּיקִים בַּֽיהֹוָ֑ה לַ֝יְשָׁרִ֗ים נָאוָ֥ה תְהִלָּֽה׃	Rejoice in the LORD, O ye righteous: for praise is comely for the upright.	Τῷ Δαυΐδ. - ΑΓΑΛΛΙΑΣΘΕ, δίκαιοι, ἐν Κυρίῳ· τοῖς εὐθέσι πρέπει αἴνεσις.
2	הוֹד֣וּ לַיהֹוָ֣ה בְּכִנּ֑וֹר בְּנֵ֥בֶל עָ֝שׂ֗וֹר זַמְּרוּ־לֽוֹ׃	Praise the LORD with harp: sing unto him with the psaltery and an instrument of ten strings.	ἐξομολογεῖσθε τῷ Κυρίῳ ἐν κιθάρᾳ, ἐν ψαλτηρίῳ δεκαχόρδῳ ψάλατε αὐτῷ.
3	שִֽׁירוּ־ל֭וֹ שִׁ֣יר חָדָ֑שׁ הֵיטִ֥יבוּ נַ֝גֵּ֗ן בִּתְרוּעָֽה׃	Sing unto him a new song; play skilfully with a loud noise.	ᾄσατε αὐτῷ ᾆσμα καινόν, καλῶς ψάλατε αὐτῷ ἐν ἀλαλαγμῷ.
4	כִּֽי־יָשָׁ֥ר דְּבַר־יְהֹוָ֑ה וְכׇל־מַ֝עֲשֵׂ֗הוּ בֶּאֱמוּנָֽה׃	For the word of the LORD is right; and all his works are done in truth.	ὅτι εὐθὴς ὁ λόγος τοῦ Κυρίου, καὶ πάντα τὰ ἔργα αὐτοῦ ἐν πίστει·
5	אֹ֭הֵב צְדָקָ֣ה וּמִשְׁפָּ֑ט חֶ֥סֶד יְ֝הֹוָ֗ה מָלְאָ֥ה הָאָֽרֶץ׃	He loveth righteousness and judgment: the earth is full of the goodness of the LORD.	ἀγαπᾷ ἐλεημοσύνην καὶ κρίσιν, τοῦ ἐλέους Κυρίου πλήρης ἡ γῆ.
6	בִּדְבַ֣ר יְ֭הֹוָה שָׁמַ֣יִם נַעֲשׂ֑וּ וּבְר֥וּחַ פִּ֝֗יו כׇּל־צְבָאָֽם׃	By the word of the LORD were the heavens made; and all the host of them by the breath of his mouth.	τῷ λόγῳ τοῦ Κυρίου οἱ οὐρανοὶ ἐστερεώθησαν καὶ τῷ πνεύματι τοῦ στόματος αὐτοῦ πᾶσα ἡ δύναμις αὐτῶν·
7	כֹּנֵ֣ס כַּ֭נֵּד מֵ֣י הַיָּ֑ם נֹתֵ֖ן בְּאוֹצָר֣וֹת תְּהוֹמֽוֹת׃	He gathereth the waters of the sea together as an heap: he layeth up the depth in storehouses.	συνάγων ὡσεὶ ἀσκὸν ὕδατα θαλάσσης, τιθεὶς ἐν θησαυροῖς ἀβύσσους.
8	יִֽירְא֣וּ מֵ֭יְהֹוָה כׇּל־הָאָ֑רֶץ מִמֶּ֥נּוּ יָ֝ג֗וּרוּ כׇּל־יֹשְׁבֵ֥י תֵבֵֽל׃	Let all the earth fear the LORD: let all the inhabitants of the world stand in awe of him.	φοβηθήτω τὸν Κύριον πᾶσα ἡ γῆ, ἀπ᾿ αὐτοῦ δὲ σαλευθήτωσαν πάντες οἱ κατοικοῦντες τὴν οἰκουμένην·
9	כִּ֤י ה֣וּא אָמַ֣ר וַיֶּ֑הִי הֽוּא־צִ֝וָּ֗ה וַֽיַּעֲמֹֽד׃	For he spake, and it was done; he commanded, and it stood fast.	ὅτι αὐτὸς εἶπε καὶ ἐγενήθησαν, αὐτὸς ἐνετείλατο καὶ ἐκτίσθησαν.
10	יְֽהֹוָ֗ה הֵפִ֥יר עֲצַת־גּוֹיִ֑ם הֵ֝נִ֗יא מַחְשְׁב֥וֹת עַמִּֽים׃	The LORD bringeth the counsel of the heathen to nought: he maketh the devices of the people of none effect.	Κύριος διασκεδάζει βουλὰς ἐθνῶν, ἀθετεῖ δὲ λογισμοὺς λαῶν καὶ ἀθετεῖ βουλὰς ἀρχόντων·
11	עֲצַ֣ת יְ֭הֹוָה לְעוֹלָ֣ם תַּעֲמֹ֑ד מַחְשְׁב֥וֹת לִ֝בּ֗וֹ לְדֹ֣ר וָדֹֽר׃	The counsel of the LORD standeth for ever, the thoughts of his heart to all generations.	ἡ δὲ βουλὴ τοῦ Κυρίου εἰς τὸν αἰῶνα μένει, λογισμοὶ τῆς καρδίας αὐτοῦ εἰς γενεὰν καὶ γενεάν.
12	אַשְׁרֵ֣י הַ֭גּוֹי אֲשֶׁר־יְהֹוָ֣ה אֱלֹהָ֑יו הָעָ֓ם ׀ בָּחַ֖ר לְנַחֲלָ֣ה לֽוֹ׃	Blessed is the nation whose God is the LORD; and the people whom he hath chosen for his own inheritance.	μακάριον τὸ ἔθνος, οὗ ἐστι Κύριος ὁ Θεὸς αὐτοῦ, λαός, ὃν ἐξελέξατο εἰς κληρονομίαν ἑαυτῷ.
13	מִ֭שָּׁמַיִם הִבִּ֣יט יְהֹוָ֑ה רָ֝אָ֗ה אֶֽת־כׇּל־בְּנֵ֥י הָאָדָֽם׃	The LORD looketh from heaven; he beholdeth all the sons of men.	ἐξ οὐρανοῦ ἐπέβλεψεν ὁ Κύριος, εἶδε πάντας τοὺς υἱοὺς τῶν ἀνθρώπων·
14	מִֽמְּכוֹן־שִׁבְתּ֥וֹ הִשְׁגִּ֑יחַ אֶ֖ל כׇּל־יֹשְׁבֵ֣י הָאָֽרֶץ׃	From the place of his habitation he looketh upon all the inhabitants of the earth.	ἐξ ἑτοίμου κατοικητηρίου αὐτοῦ ἐπέβλεψεν ἐπὶ πάντας τοὺς κατοικοῦντας τὴν γῆν,
15	הַיֹּצֵ֣ר יַ֣חַד לִבָּ֑ם הַ֝מֵּבִ֗ין אֶל־כׇּל־מַעֲשֵׂיהֶֽם׃	He fashioneth their hearts alike; he considereth all their works.	ὁ πλάσας κατὰ μόνας τὰς καρδίας αὐτῶν, ὁ συνιεὶς πάντα τὰ ἔργα αὐτῶν.
16	אֵֽין־הַ֭מֶּלֶךְ נוֹשָׁ֣ע בְּרׇב־חָ֑יִל גִּ֝בּ֗וֹר לֹא־יִנָּצֵ֥ל בְּרׇב־כֹּֽחַ׃	There is no king saved by the multitude of an host: a mighty man is not delivered by much strength.	οὐ σῴζεται βασιλεὺς διὰ πολλὴν δύναμιν, καὶ γίγας οὐ σωθήσεται ἐν πλήθει ἰσχύος αὐτοῦ.
17	שֶׁ֣קֶר הַ֭סּוּס לִתְשׁוּעָ֑ה וּבְרֹ֥ב חֵ֝יל֗וֹ לֹ֣א יְמַלֵּֽט׃	An horse is a vain thing for safety: neither shall he deliver any by his great strength.	ψευδὴς ἵππος εἰς σωτηρίαν, ἐν δὲ πλήθει δυνάμεως αὐτοῦ οὐ σωθήσεται.
18	הִנֵּ֤ה עֵ֣ין יְ֭הֹוָה אֶל־יְרֵאָ֑יו לַֽמְיַחֲלִ֥ים לְחַסְדּֽוֹ׃	Behold, the eye of the LORD is upon them that fear him, upon them that hope in his mercy;	ἰδοὺ οἱ ὀφθαλμοὶ Κυρίου ἐπὶ τοὺς φοβουμένους αὐτὸν τοὺς ἐλπίζοντας ἐπὶ τὸ ἔλεος αὐτοῦ,
19	לְהַצִּ֣יל מִמָּ֣וֶת נַפְשָׁ֑ם וּ֝לְחַיּוֹתָ֗ם בָּרָעָֽב׃	To deliver their soul from death, and to keep them alive in famine.	ῥύσασθαι ἐκ θανάτου τὰς ψυχὰς αὐτῶν καὶ διαθρέψαι αὐτοὺς ἐν λιμῷ.
20	נַ֭פְשֵׁנוּ חִכְּתָ֣ה לַֽיהֹוָ֑ה עֶזְרֵ֖נוּ וּמָגִנֵּ֣נוּ הֽוּא׃	Our soul waiteth for the LORD: he is our help and our shield.	ἡ ψυχὴ ἡμῶν ὑπομενεῖ τῷ Κυρίῳ, ὅτι βοηθὸς καὶ ὑπερασπιστὴς ἡμῶν ἐστιν·
21	כִּי־ב֭וֹ יִשְׂמַ֣ח לִבֵּ֑נוּ כִּ֤י בְשֵׁ֖ם קׇדְשׁ֣וֹ בָטָֽחְנוּ׃	For our heart shall rejoice in him, because we have trusted in his holy name.	ὅτι ἐν αὐτῷ εὐφρανθήσεται ἡ καρδία ἡμῶν, καὶ ἐν τῷ ὀνόματι τῷ ἁγίῳ αὐτοῦ ἠλπίσαμεν.
22	יְהִי־חַסְדְּךָ֣ יְהֹוָ֣ה עָלֵ֑ינוּ כַּ֝אֲשֶׁ֗ר יִחַ֥לְנוּ לָֽךְ׃	Let thy mercy, O LORD, be upon us, according as we hope in thee.	γένοιτο, Κύριε, τὸ ἔλεός σου ἐφ᾿ ἡμᾶς, καθάπερ ἠλπίσαμεν ἐπὶ σέ.

=== Verse 7 ===
He gathers the waters of the sea together as a heap;
He lays up the deep in storehouses.

Alternatively, "as a heap" may be read as "in a vessel", or "in a wineskin".

== Bibliography ==
- Briggs, Charles Augustus; Briggs, Emilie Grace (1960) [1906]. A Critical and Exegetical Commentary on the Book of Psalms. International Critical Commentary. Vol. 1. Edinburgh: T & T Clark.
- Nosson Scherman (1984), The Complete Artscroll Siddur, Mesorah Publications, ISBN 978-0899066509.
