= Samson ben Eliezer =

14th-century German sofer, known as Barukh She'amar

Rabbi Samson ben Eliezer (Hebrew: שמשון בן אליעזר) was a 14th-century German sofer (scribe); better known as Barukh She'amar, from the initial words of the blessing which he recited joyfully, even in boyhood, at the shacharit (morning) service. He was born in Saxony, but later went with his parents to Prague. Orphaned when eight years old, he was adopted by R. Issachar, a learned scribe, who taught him to write tefillin, mezuzot, and Torah scrolls. Samson apparently traveled through Austria, Poland, Lusatia, Thuringia, and Bavaria, and finally went to Israel to study the work of the soferim of the Holy Land. There, he discovered that the majority of the soferim were ignorant of the correct halacha and tradition about the letters. He endeavored to correct this in his book "Barukh She'amar" (Shklov, 1804), which contains a treatise by R. Abraham of Sinzheim, a pupil of Meïr of Rothenburg, on the making and writing of tefillin, together with Samson's own notes from the "Halakot Gedolot," "SMaG," "Sefer HaTerumah," "Sefer HaRoḳeaḥ," and other works.

This same edition, which is poorly edited, likewise contains the "Otiyyot de-Rabbi Aḳiba" and various kabbalistic notes on the form of the letters.

According to Chaim Yosef David Azulai, the name "Barukh she-Amar" became hereditary in the family; and Joseph Caro in his "Bet Yosef" mentions a certain R. Isaac Baruk she-Amar, probably a descendant of Samson.
