= Atah Hu Adonai L'Vadecha =

Jewish morning prayer

Atah Hu Adonai L'Vadecha (Hebrew: אתה-הוא יהוה לבדך, "You alone are the Lord") is a series of verses recited in most communities during Shacharit, the morning prayers of Judaism, in pesukei dezimra. It is composed of verses 5–11 in Chapter 9 of Nechemiah.

The recitation of these verses was introduced in the 13th century by Rabbi Meir of Rothenburg. The custom to recite these verses, along with Vayivarech David (from Chronicles), prior to the Song of the sea is in order to recall miracles brought on by God at the Red Sea.

In most Ashekenazic siddurim, this prayer appears as two separate paragraphs. What is interesting about this division is not the division itself, but the fact that it occurs in the middle of the third verse (Nechemiah 9:8). This is signifying Abraham's change of name from Abram to Abraham, elevating his status from the father of Aram to the father of a multitude of nations. The division originates a custom that when there is a Berit Milah taking place in the community, the second part (through the end of Az Yashir) is recited responsively.

The verses do not appear at all in Italki (Italian Rite) siddurim, which go immediately from Vayivarech David into the verses introducing the Song of the Sea.
