= Saint Peter and Judaism =

The relationship between Saint Peter and Judaism is thought to have been fairly positive.

== Apostle to the Jews ==
Paul the Apostle writes that Peter had the special charge of being an apostle to the Jews, just as he was the apostle to the Gentiles. Another apostle, James, is regarded as the leader of the Jewish Christians.

== Incident at Antioch ==
The incident at Antioch refers to a meeting between Paul the Apostle and Peter described in the Epistle to the Galatians. As Gentiles began to convert from paganism to Christianity, a dispute arose among Christian leaders as to whether or not Gentiles needed to observe all the tenets of Mosaic Law. In particular, it was debated as to whether Gentile converts needed to be circumcised or observe the Judean dietary laws. Paul was a strong advocate of the position that Gentiles need not be circumcised or observe dietary laws. Others, sometimes termed Judaizers, felt that Gentile Christians needed to fully comply with the Mosaic Law.

== Council of Jerusalem ==
Peter was a leader at the Council of Jerusalem. He ultimately stood a middle-ground between the Jewish Christians and the Gentile Christians. It was agreed that avoidance of idolatry, fornication, and the eating of flesh cut from a living animal should be demanded of Gentiles who wished to become Christians.

== Tosaphists ==
The Tosaphist Rabbeinu Tam wrote that Peter was "a devout and learned Jew who dedicated his life to guiding gentiles along the proper path". Rabbeinu Tam also taught that Peter was the author of the Shabbat and feast-day prayer Nishmat, and this was a popularly held belief through the Middle Ages. Otzar Hatefillah, quoting Mahzor Vitri, pointedly denies this claim, offering instead Simeon ben Shetach as the probable author. Peter is also thought to have authored a prayer for Yom Kippur in order to prove his commitment to Judaism despite his work among Gentiles.

== Other ==
According to an ancient Jewish tradition, Peter was sent by the rabbis in order to move Christianity in its own direction, to prevent it from being considered another branch of Judaism.
