= Yehi kevod =

Jewish morning prayer

Yehi kevod (Hebrew: יְהִי כְבוֹד, lit. '[God] will be honored') is a prayer recited daily during pesukei dezimra prior to Ashrei. The prayer is a representation of God's exaltation in both the heavens and the earth.

The succession Yehi kevod has with Ashrei is significant: it symbolizes the connection of an inner relationship in which God as a helper and comforter whose loving-kindness is ever near us.

The Ashkenazi version has 18 verses. The number 18 is significant, and is constant throughout prayer. Also, God's name is mentioned in the prayer 18 times, alluding to the 18 verses in Ashrei.

The first half of the prayer describes God as the master of nature. The second half describes God as the master of history.

== Verses ==
Yehi Khevod consists of the following verses in the following order:

- Psalm 104:31
- Psalm 113:2-4
- Psalm 135:13
- Psalm 103:19
- Chronicles I: 16:31
- Psalm 10:16
- Psalm 92:1
- Exodus 15:18
- Psalm 10:16
- Psalm 33:10
- Proverbs 19:21
- Psalm 33:11
- Psalm 33:9
- Psalm 132:13
- Psalm 135:4
- Psalm 94:14
- Psalm 78:38
- Psalm 20:09
- Yemenite Judaism also inserts Psalm 46:12.
