= Psalm 135 =

Psalm in the Book of Psalms

- "Praise ye the LORD"
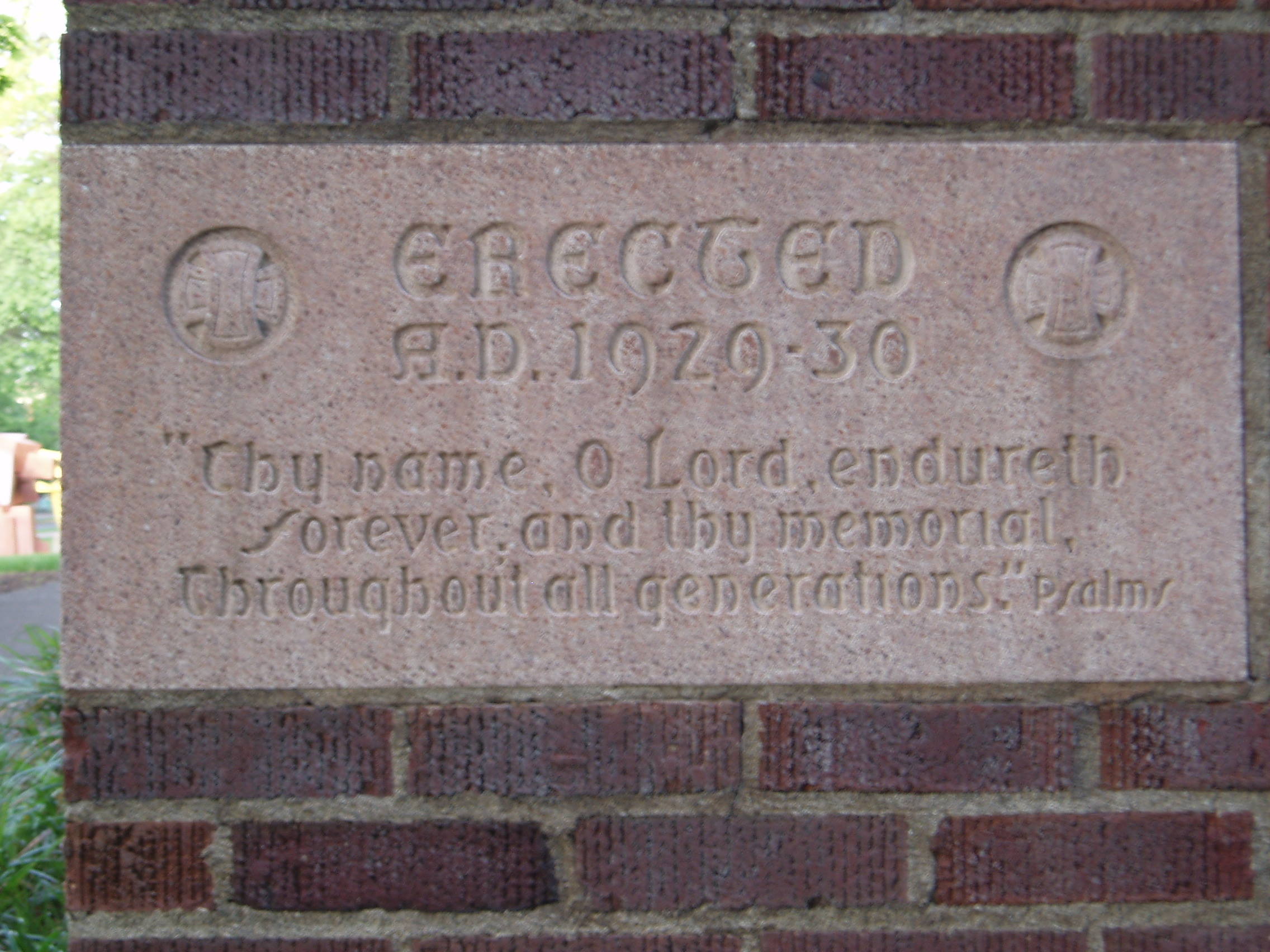
- Other name: Psalm 134; "Laudate nomen Domini"
- Language: Hebrew (original)

Psalm 135
- ← Psalm 134 Psalm 136 →
- Book: Book of Psalms
- Hebrew Bible part: Ketuvim
- Order in the Hebrew part: 1
- Category: Sifrei Emet
- Christian Bible part: Old Testament
- Order in the Christian part: 19

Psalm 135 is the 135th psalm from the Book of Psalms, a part of the Hebrew Bible and the Christian Old Testament, beginning in English in the King James Version: "Praise ye the LORD". In the slightly different numbering system of the Greek Septuagint and Latin Vulgate versions of the Bible, this psalm is Psalm 134. Its Latin title is "Laudate nomen Domini".

The psalm forms a regular part of Jewish, Catholic, Lutheran, Anglican and other Protestant liturgies. It has been set to music.

== Allusions to other psalms and OT passages ==
Cyril Rodd notes references to Psalm 134 in verses 2 and 21, to Deuteronomy 32:36 (the Song of Moses) in verse 14, and to Exodus 19:5 and Deuteronomy 7:6 in verse 4, and "a close similarity" between verses 15-20 and Psalm 115:4-11. Verse 7 is reflected in Jeremiah 10:13.

== Uses ==
=== New Testament ===
- Verse 14a is quoted in Hebrews 10:30.

=== Judaism ===
- The feasts of Tabernacles and of Passover have been put forward as suggested suitable occasions for the use of this psalm.
- This psalm is recited in its entirety during the Pesukei Dezimra on Shabbat, Yom Tov, and - in many communities - on Hoshana Rabbah, and on the fifth day of Passover in some traditions.
- Verse 13 is the fifth verse of Yehi Kivod in Pesukei Dezimra. Verse 4 is the fifteenth verse of Yehi Kivod.
- Verse 21 is the second verse of Baruch Hashem L'Olam in Pesukei Dezimra and Baruch Hashem L'Olam during Maariv.

=== Eastern Orthodox Church ===
- Along with Psalm 135, Psalm 136 is used in the Polyeleos service, is sung at Orthros (Matins) of a Feast Day and at Vigils. In some Slavic traditions and on Mount Athos it is read every Sunday at Orthros, on Mount Athos accompanied by candles, bells, and censers.
- At vigils, it accompanies the opening of the Royal Doors and a great censing of the nave by the Priest(s) or Deacon(s).

== Musical settings ==
Heinrich Schütz composed a metred paraphrase of Psalm 135 in German, "Lobt Gott von Herzengrunde", SWV 240, for the Becker Psalter, published first in 1628.

Seminary professor Timothy Slemmons composed a guitar-based setting, "Maker's Melody," for his paraphrase of Psalm 135. Part of his five-volume project entitled "Revenant Psalms," "Psalm 135 [Maker's Melody"] appears as the final track on Vol. IV.

== Text ==
The following table shows the Hebrew text of the Psalm with vowels, alongside the Koine Greek text in the Septuagint and the English translation from the King James Version. Note that the meaning can slightly differ between these versions, as the Septuagint and the Masoretic Text come from different textual traditions. (Note: A 1917 translation directly from Hebrew to English by the Jewish Publication Society can be found here or here, and an 1844 translation directly from the Septuagint by L. C. L. Brenton can be found here. Both translations are in the public domain.) In the Septuagint, this psalm is numbered Psalm 134.

#	Hebrew	English	Greek
1	הַ֥לְלוּ־יָ֨הּ ׀ הַֽ֭לְלוּ אֶת־שֵׁ֣ם יְהֹוָ֑ה הַֽ֝לְל֗וּ עַבְדֵ֥י יְהֹוָֽה׃	Praise ye the LORD. Praise ye the name of the LORD; praise him, O ye servants of the LORD.	᾿Αλληλούΐα. - ΑΙΝΕΙΤΕ τὸ ὄνομα Κυρίου, αἰνεῖτε, δοῦλοι, Κύριον,
2	שֶׁ֣֭עֹמְדִים בְּבֵ֣ית יְהֹוָ֑ה בְּ֝חַצְר֗וֹת בֵּ֣ית אֱלֹהֵֽינוּ׃	Ye that stand in the house of the LORD, in the courts of the house of our God,	οἱ ἑστῶτες ἐν οἴκῳ Κυρίου, ἐν αὐλαῖς οἴκου Θεοῦ ἡμῶν.
3	הַֽלְלוּ־יָ֭הּ כִּֽי־ט֣וֹב יְהֹוָ֑ה זַמְּר֥וּ לִ֝שְׁמ֗וֹ כִּ֣י נָעִֽים׃	Praise the LORD; for the LORD is good: sing praises unto his name; for it is pleasant.	αἰνεῖτε τὸν Κύριον, ὅτι ἀγαθὸς Κύριος· ψάλατε τῷ ὀνόματι αὐτοῦ, ὅτι καλόν·
4	כִּֽי־יַעֲקֹ֗ב בָּחַ֣ר ל֣וֹ יָ֑הּ יִ֝שְׂרָאֵ֗ל לִסְגֻלָּתֽוֹ׃	For the LORD hath chosen Jacob unto himself, and Israel for his peculiar treasure.	ὅτι τὸν ᾿Ιακὼβ ἐξελέξατο ἑαυτῷ ὁ Κύριος, ᾿Ισραὴλ εἰς περιουσιασμὸν ἑαυτῷ.
5	כִּ֤י אֲנִ֣י יָ֭דַעְתִּי כִּֽי־גָד֣וֹל יְהֹוָ֑ה וַ֝אֲדֹנֵ֗ינוּ מִכׇּל־אֱלֹהִֽים׃	For I know that the LORD is great, and that our LORD is above all gods.	ὅτι ἐγὼ ἔγνωκα ὅτι μέγας ὁ Κύριος, καὶ ὁ Κύριος ἡμῶν παρὰ πάντας τοὺς θεούς.
6	כֹּ֤ל אֲשֶׁר־חָפֵ֥ץ יְהֹוָ֗ה עָ֫שָׂ֥ה בַּשָּׁמַ֥יִם וּבָאָ֑רֶץ בַּ֝יַּמִּ֗ים וְכׇל־תְּהֹמֽוֹת׃	Whatsoever the LORD pleased, that did he in heaven, and in earth, in the seas, and all deep places.	πάντα, ὅσα ἠθέλησεν ὁ Κύριος ἐποίησεν ἐν τῷ οὐρανῷ καὶ ἐν τῇ γῇ, ἐν ταῖς θαλάσσαις καὶ ἐν πάσαις ταῖς ἀβύσσοις·
7	מַעֲלֶ֣ה נְשִׂאִים֮ מִקְצֵ֢ה הָ֫אָ֥רֶץ בְּרָקִ֣ים לַמָּטָ֣ר עָשָׂ֑ה מֽוֹצֵא־ר֝֗וּחַ מֵאֽוֹצְרוֹתָֽיו׃	He causeth the vapours to ascend from the ends of the earth; he maketh lightnings for the rain; he bringeth the wind out of his treasuries.	ἀνάγων νεφέλας ἐξ ἐσχάτου τῆς γῆς, ἀστραπὰς εἰς ὑετὸν ἐποίησεν· ὁ ἐξάγων ἀνέμους ἐκ θησαυρῶν αὐτοῦ,
8	שֶׁ֭הִכָּה בְּכוֹרֵ֣י מִצְרָ֑יִם מֵ֝אָדָ֗ם עַד־בְּהֵמָֽה׃	Who smote the firstborn of Egypt, both of man and beast.	ὃς ἐπάταξε τὰ πρωτότοκα Αἰγύπτου ἀπὸ ἀνθρώπου ἕως κτήνους.
9	שָׁלַ֤ח ׀ אוֹתֹ֣ת וּ֭מֹפְתִים בְּתוֹכֵ֣כִי מִצְרָ֑יִם בְּ֝פַרְעֹ֗ה וּבְכׇל־עֲבָדָֽיו׃	Who sent tokens and wonders into the midst of thee, O Egypt, upon Pharaoh, and upon all his servants.	ἐξαπέστειλε σημεῖα καὶ τέρατα ἐν μέσῳ σου, Αἴγυπτε, ἐν Φαραὼ καὶ ἐν πᾶσι τοῖς δούλοις αὐτοῦ.
10	שֶׁ֭הִכָּה גּוֹיִ֣ם רַבִּ֑ים וְ֝הָרַ֗ג מְלָכִ֥ים עֲצוּמִֽים׃	Who smote great nations, and slew mighty kings;	ὃς ἐπάταξεν ἔθνη πολλὰ καὶ ἀπέκτεινε βασιλεῖς κραταιούς.
11	לְסִיח֤וֹן ׀ מֶ֤לֶךְ הָאֱמֹרִ֗י וּ֭לְעוֹג מֶ֣לֶךְ הַבָּשָׁ֑ן וּ֝לְכֹ֗ל מַמְלְכ֥וֹת כְּנָֽעַן׃	Sihon king of the Amorites, and Og king of Bashan, and all the kingdoms of Canaan:	τὸν Σηὼν βασιλέα τῶν ᾿Αμορραίων καὶ τὸν ῍Ωγ βασιλέα τῆς Βασὰν καὶ πάσας τὰς βασιλείας Χαναάν,
12	וְנָתַ֣ן אַרְצָ֣ם נַחֲלָ֑ה נַ֝חֲלָ֗ה לְיִשְׂרָאֵ֥ל עַמּֽוֹ׃	And gave their land for an heritage, an heritage unto Israel his people.	καὶ ἔδωκε τὴν γῆν αὐτῶν κληρονομίαν, κληρονομίαν ᾿Ισραὴλ λαῷ αὐτοῦ.
13	יְ֭הֹוָה שִׁמְךָ֣ לְעוֹלָ֑ם יְ֝הֹוָ֗ה זִכְרְךָ֥ לְדֹר־וָדֹֽר׃	Thy name, O LORD, endureth for ever; and thy memorial, O LORD, throughout all generations.	Κύριε, τὸ ὄνομά σου εἰς τὸν αἰῶνα καὶ τὸ μνημόσυνόν σου εἰς γενεὰν καὶ γενεάν.
14	כִּֽי־יָדִ֣ין יְהֹוָ֣ה עַמּ֑וֹ וְעַל־עֲ֝בָדָ֗יו יִתְנֶחָֽם׃	For the LORD will judge his people, and he will repent himself concerning his servants.	ὅτι κρινεῖ Κύριος τὸν λαὸν αὐτοῦ καὶ ἐπὶ τοῖς δούλοις αὐτοῦ παρακληθήσεται.
15	עֲצַבֵּ֣י הַ֭גּוֹיִם כֶּ֣סֶף וְזָהָ֑ב מַ֝עֲשֵׂ֗ה יְדֵ֣י אָדָֽם׃	The idols of the heathen are silver and gold, the work of men's hands.	τὰ εἴδωλα τῶν ἐθνῶν ἀργύριον καὶ χρυσίον, ἔργα χειρῶν ἀνθρώπων·
16	פֶּֽה־לָ֭הֶם וְלֹ֣א יְדַבֵּ֑רוּ עֵינַ֥יִם לָ֝הֶ֗ם וְלֹ֣א יִרְאֽוּ׃	They have mouths, but they speak not; eyes have they, but they see not;	στόμα ἔχουσι καὶ οὐ λαλήσουσιν, ὀφθαλμοὺς ἔχουσι καὶ οὐκ ὄψονται,
17	אׇזְנַ֣יִם לָ֭הֶם וְלֹ֣א יַאֲזִ֑ינוּ אַ֝֗ף אֵין־יֶשׁ־ר֥וּחַ בְּפִיהֶֽם׃	They have ears, but they hear not; neither is there any breath in their mouths.	ὦτα ἔχουσι καὶ οὐκ ἐνωτισθήσονται, οὐδὲ γάρ ἐστι πνεῦμα ἐν τῷ στόματι αὐτῶν.
18	כְּ֭מוֹהֶם יִהְי֣וּ עֹשֵׂיהֶ֑ם כֹּ֖ל אֲשֶׁר־בֹּטֵ֣חַ בָּהֶֽם׃	They that make them are like unto them: so is every one that trusteth in them.	ὅμοιοι αὐτοῖς γένοιντο οἱ ποιοῦντες αὐτὰ καὶ πάντες οἱ πεποιθότες ἐπ᾿ αὐτοῖς.
19	בֵּ֣ית יִ֭שְׂרָאֵל בָּרְכ֣וּ אֶת־יְהֹוָ֑ה בֵּ֥ית אַ֝הֲרֹ֗ן בָּרְכ֥וּ אֶת־יְהֹוָֽה׃	Bless the LORD, O house of Israel: bless the LORD, O house of Aaron:	οἶκος ᾿Ισραήλ, εὐλογήσατε τὸν Κύριον· οἶκος ᾿Ααρών, εὐλογήσατε τὸν Κύριον.
20	בֵּ֣ית הַ֭לֵּוִי בָּרְכ֣וּ אֶת־יְהֹוָ֑ה יִֽרְאֵ֥י יְ֝הֹוָ֗ה בָּרְכ֥וּ אֶת־יְהֹוָֽה׃	Bless the LORD, O house of Levi: ye that fear the LORD, bless the LORD.	οἶκος Λευΐ, εὐλογήσατε τὸν Κύριον· οἱ φοβούμενοι τὸν Κύριον, εὐλογήσατε τὸν Κύριον,
21	בָּ֘ר֤וּךְ יְהֹוָ֨ה ׀ מִצִּיּ֗וֹן שֹׁ֘כֵ֤ן יְֽרוּשָׁלָ֗͏ִם הַֽלְלוּ־יָֽהּ׃	Blessed be the LORD out of Zion, which dwelleth at Jerusalem. Praise ye the LORD.	εὐλογητὸς Κύριος ἐκ Σιών, ὁ κατοικῶν ῾Ιερουσαλήμ.
