= Pesukei dezimra =

Jewish liturgical tradition

Pesukei dezimra (Jewish Babylonian Aramaic: פְּסוּקֵי דְזִמְרָא, romanized: pǝsuqē ḏǝzimrā, lit. 'Verses of praise'; Rabbinic Hebrew: פַּסוּקֵי הַזְּמִירוֹת pasuqẽ hazzǝmiroṯ "Verses of songs"), or zemirot as they are called by the Spanish and Portuguese Jews, are a group of prayers that may be recited during Shacharit (the morning set of prayers in Judaism). They consist of various blessings, psalms, and sequences of other Biblical verses. Historically, reciting pesuqe dezimra in morning prayer was only practiced by the especially pious. Throughout Jewish history, their recitation has become widespread among the various rites of Jewish prayer.

The goal of pesukei dezimra is for the individual to recite praises of God before making the requests featured later in Shacharit and the day.

== Origin ==
The first source for pesuke dezimra is in the Babylonian Talmud, where it is described as non-obligatory (performed by some people but not others):

Rabbi Yosei said: May my portion be among those who eat three meals on Shabbat. Apropos this statement of Rabbi Yosei, the Gemara cites additional declarations. Rabbi Yosei said: May my portion be among those who complete hallel every day. The Gemara is surprised at this: Is that so? Didn’t the Master say: One who reads hallel every day is tantamount to one who curses and blasphemes God. He displays contempt for hallel by not reserving it for days on which miracles occurred. The Gemara answers: When we say this statement of Rabbi Yosei, we are referring to the verses of praise (Hallel) of [pesukei dezimra], recited during the morning service, not to hallel (Psalms 113–118) recited on special days.

Later commentaries explain what Hallel of pesuke dezimra consists of: Rashi said it means psalms 148 and 150, Saadia Gaon said it means psalms 147-150, while Menachem HaMeiri (d. 1375) and Maimonides in Mishneh Torah, Hilchot Tefilah 7:12 said it meant all of psalms 145-150. Nowadays, it is customary for pesuke dezimra to include psalms 145-150 as well as several other psalms, recitations, and blessings before Barukh she'amar and after Yishtabach as pesuke dezimra.

Elsewhere, the Talmud states that a person should praise God and only afterwards begin prayer. Opinions differ as to which praise is referred to: the first three blessings of the Amidah, the Shema blessings, or to pesukei dezimra.

For a long time, these prayers remained optional. Eventually, pesukei dezimra were incorporated into all standard Jewish prayer services. Maimonides taught that prayer should be recited in an upbeat mood, slowly, and wholeheartedly, and that rushing through them (as many who recite them daily do) defeats their purpose.

Rashi commented on Talmud Berakhot 4b:16 that the prayer that Jews are required to say thrice daily to be assured a place in the World to Come is Psalm 145. Rashi considered that singing of three psalms 145, 148, 150 in the morning is required of Jewish personal prayer (not communal). Maimonides considered the same, and that communal prayer begins just starting from the Kaddish and Shema.

== Order ==
=== Ashkenazi ===
- Psalm 30 (an addition in the 18th century, adopted in the Eastern Ashkenazic rite, but not in the Western Ashkenazic rite or by those who follow the practices of the Vilna Gaon)
- Barukh she'amar
- Songs of thanksgiving
- Psalm 100 (omitted on Shabbat, Yom Tov, Erev Yom Kippur, Erev Passover, and Chol HaMoed Passover)
- The following psalms are recited on Shabbat and Yom Tov only, and - in the Eastern Ashkenazic rite - also on Hoshana Rabbah: 19, 34, 90, 91, 135, 136, 33, 92, and 93
- Yehi kevod
- Hallel (pesukei dezimra) (Ashrei and psalms 145-150)
- Baruch HaShem Le'Olam
- Vayivarech David
- Atah Hu Adonai L'Vadecha
- Song of the Sea
- Nishmat (Shabbat and Jewish holidays only)
- Shochen Ad (Shabbat and Yom Tov only)
- Yishtabach

=== Sephardi/Mizrahi ===
- Songs of thanksgiving
- Psalm 30
- The following psalms are recited on Shabbat, and Yom Tov only: 19, 33, 90, 91, 98
- On Yom Tov, the psalm for each holiday is recited: On Passover, 107; On Shavuot, 68; on Sukkot, 42 and 43; on Shemini Atzeret, 12
- The following psalms are recited on Shabbat, and Yom Tov only: 121, 122, 123, 124, 135, 136,
- Barukh she'amar
- 92 and 93 (recited on Shabbat, and Yom Tov only)
- Psalm 100 (recited on Erev Yom Kippur and Erev Passover, omitted on Shabbat and Yom Tov)
- Yehi Kivod
- Hallel (pesukei dezimra) (Ashrei and psalms 145-150)
- Baruch HaShem Le'Olam
- Vayivarech David
- Ata Hu Hashem L'Vadecha
- Az Yashir
- Nishmat (Shabbat and Yom Tov only)
- Shav'at Aniyim (Shabbat and Yom Tov only)
- Yishtabach

=== Italian rite ===
- Hashem Melekh
- Psalm 100 and Psalm 136 are recited only on the Sabbath and festivals.
- Psalm 93 is recited at this point on weekdays only.
- Songs of thanksgiving (Only the first half, from Chronicles is recited at this point. The second half or selected verses recited in other rites is not recited at this point.)
- Psalm 19. Psalm 97 is recited on Festivals and Hoshanah Rabbah, but not on weekdays of the Sabbath. Psalm 99 is recited every day.
- A collection of verses, parallel to the "second half" of the Songs of thanksgiving in other rites
- In the late minhag, a Mourner's Kaddish is recited on weekdays only.
- On the Sabbath and Festivals Psalm 135 is added.
- Barukh she'amar
- On the Sabbath and Festivals, Psalm 92, Psalm 93 and the last verse of Psalm 91 are added.
- Hallel (pesukei dezimra) (Ashrei and psalms 145-150)
- Baruch HaShem Le'Olam
- Vayivarech David.
- Az Yashir (On Tisha Be-av, the Song of the Sea and "Kol beru'e ma'alah" are omitted, and the service continues with Yishtabach)
- A piyyut "Kol beru'e ma'alah" by Solomon ibn Gabirol
- On the Sabbath and Festivals, Psalm 34 is added.
- On special Sabbaths and some Festivals, a piyyut is recited before Nishmat.
- On the Sabbath and Festivals, Nishmat is recited. The version recited on Festivals is slightly longer than the version recited on the Sabbath.
- Matzil Ani (Sabbath and Festivals only)
- Yishtabach

== Origin ==
During the temple service during the days of the temple, a series of thanksgiving prayers were recited. These have since become incorporated into daily prayer.

== Placement in service ==
While Nusach Ashkenaz recites Hodu Barukh she'amar, Sephardi custom recites it beforehand. Some explain that the Ashkenazic practice is based the current world being called the World of Yezirah, a world that is not repaired. Therefore one that does not receive light from itself. In contrast, the Sephardic practice is to recite these prayers are recited before Barukh She'amar because the prayers receive tikkun from assiah, as they follow Kaddish. Others explain that Nusach Ashkenaz recites the after Barukh She'amar because Barukh She'amar serves as an opening to the praises of God, whereas the Sephardic practice recites it after because Hodu is from Chronicles (rather than Psalms) and Barukh She'amar says that we recite the "Songs of David".

Psalm 100 is recited after Barukh She'amar in all rites.

== Prayers included ==
The songs of thanksgiving are:

=== Hodu ===
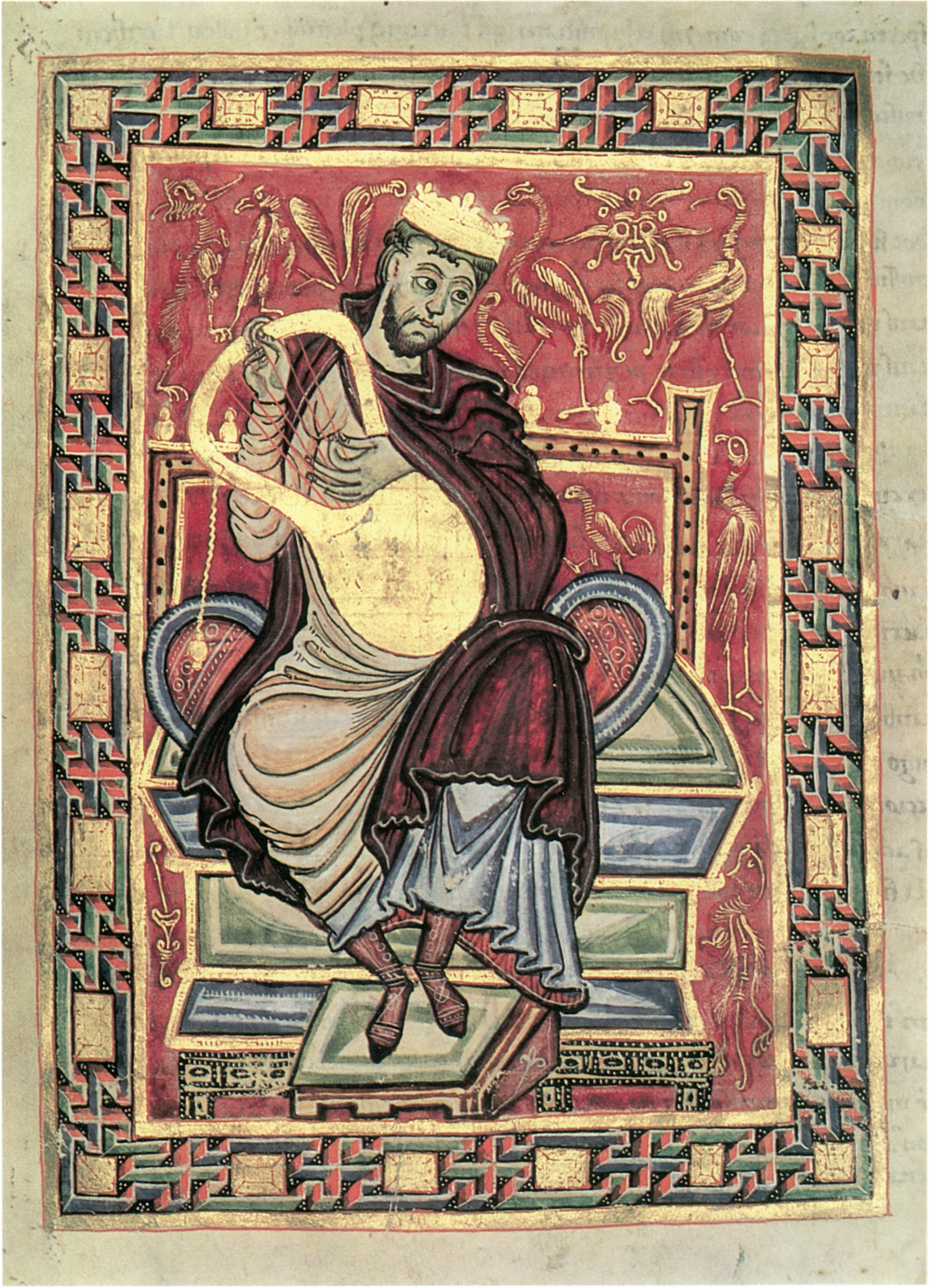
King David playing the lyre, circa 980 A.D. Egbert Psalter (Codex Gertrudianus) Cividale del Friuli, Museo Archeologico , f. 20v

Hodu Lashem Kir'u Bishmo, or "Hodu" (from 1 Chronicles 16:8–36). This is the longer one of the thanksgiving prayers. According to tradition, it was first recited by David after he recovered the ark from the Philistines. Following this event, it became a standard prayer.

=== Psalm 100 ===
Psalm 100 is the shorter prayer. The psalm thanks God for all the daily miracles that happen to us in total oblivion, as we are routinely in danger without even knowing it.

Psalm 100 is omitted by Ashkenazi Jews on Shabbat, Jewish holidays, the eves of Yom Kippur and Passover, and the Chol HaMoed (intermediate days) of Passover. On Shabbat and Yom Tov, it is omitted because offering Thanksgiving is voluntary, and therefore is not done on days with Shabbat-like restrictions. On the Eve of Passover, it is omitted because during the temple service, one may not be able to finish eating the offering, which was chametz, before the time in which it was forbidden to eat chametz. On Passover, it is omitted because of its chametz content. On the Eve of Yom Kippur, it is omitted because one may not be able to finish the contents before the fast sets in.

Sephardim still recite it on the Eves of Yom Kippur and Passover, and segment of them still recites it on Shabbat and Yom Tov.

In the Italian rite, this Psalm is recited only on Shabbat and Yom Tov, and it is omitted during the week.

== Shabbat/Yom Tov additions ==
On Shabbat and holidays of biblical origin (and in the Eastern Ashkenazic rite, also on Hoshana Rabba), various psalms are added between Hodu and Yehi Khevod. No one has to rush off to work these days, allowing extra time for praise.

Ashkenazi Judaism includes the following psalms in the following order: 19, 33, 34, 90, 91, 135, 136, 92, and 93.

Sephardic Judaism includes the following psalms in the following order: 103, 19, 33, 90, 91, 98, 121, 122, 123, 124, 135, 136, 92, and 93.

On Shabbat and Jewish holidays, Nishmat is inserted between the Song of the sea and the closing blessing; according to many, it is in fact an expanded version of the concluding blessing.

Following Nishmat, in the Ashkenazic rite, Shokhen Ad is inserted. On Shabbat, the hazzan for Shacharit begins recitation of Shochein Ad (technically speaking, it is not necessary to have a hazzan for Pesukei Dezimra at all). On the Three Pilgrimage Festivals, there are a variety of customs: According to the Eastern Ashkenazic rite, the hazzan begins the service on the previous verse known as Hakel B'tzatzumot on each of the Pilgrimage Festivals, signifying miracles God performed associated with these three holidays. According to the Western Ashkenazic rite, the hazzan begins ha-gibur la-nezach on Passover, Hakel B'tzatzumot on Shavuot and ha-gadol bi-khvot shemecha on Sukkot.

On the High Holy Days, the hazzan begins on the word hamelekh (המלך) within that verse, as during these days, an emphasis is placed on recognition of God as King. It is also described in the Book of Life that loudly chanting the word Hamelekh has the effect of driving away accusers from the throne of judgement. Additionally, the letter ה is dropped off the word היושב, alluding to the fact that now God is sitting on the throne.

== Recitation by women ==
There is an argument in Orthodox Judaism as to whether women are required or even permitted to recite the blessings of pesuke dezimra, given that it is considered by some to be a time-bound commandment. The opinions either require women to recite it completely, prohibit the recitation of Barukh She'amar and Yishtabach among women, or allow but do not require its recitation.

Ashkenazi Judaism considers pesuke dezimra to be an obligation because it is not time-bound and can be recited at any time of day.

Opinions in Sephardic Judaism are divided. Some opinions allow women to recite pesukei dezimra without its accompanying blessings.
