= Psalm 136 =

Psalm in the Book of Psalms

- "O give thanks unto the LORD; for he is good: for his mercy endureth for ever."
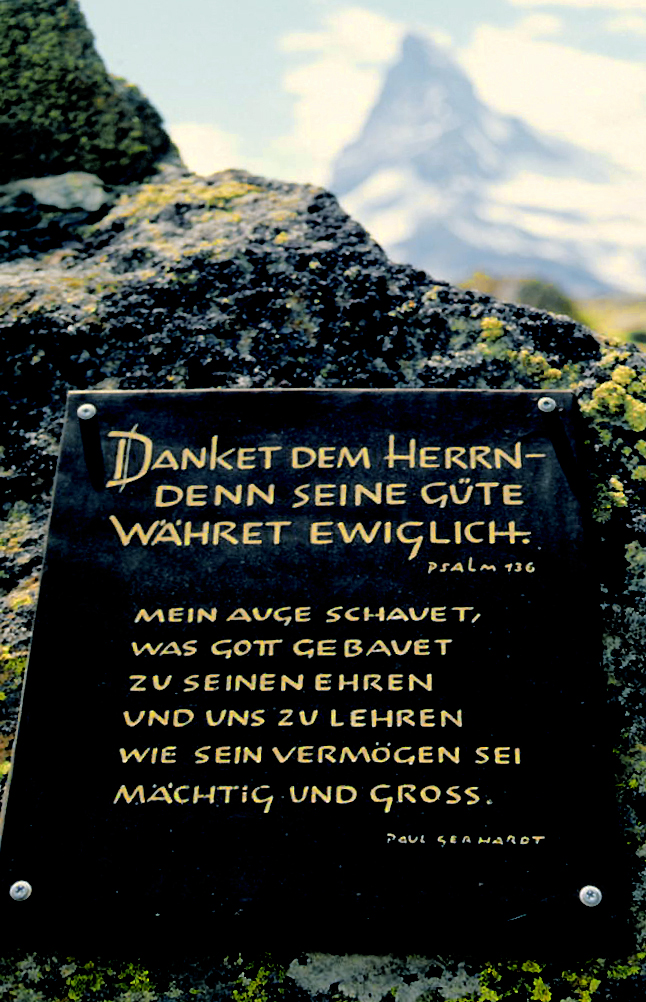
- Plaque quoting verse 1 from Psalm 136 at an ascent to the Matterhorn together with lines from a hymn by Paul Gerhardt based on it
- Other name: Psalm 135; "Confitemini Domino quoniam bonus" (Catholic Church); Έξομολογεῖσθε τῷ Κυρίῳ (Eastern Orthodox Church)
- Language: Hebrew (original)

Psalm 136
- ← Psalm 135 Psalm 137 →
- Book: Book of Psalms
- Hebrew Bible part: Ketuvim
- Order in the Hebrew part: 1
- Category: Sifrei Emet
- Christian Bible part: Old Testament
- Order in the Christian part: 19

Psalm 136 is the 136th psalm of the Book of Psalms, beginning in English in the King James Version: "O give thanks unto the LORD; for he is good: for his mercy endureth for ever. ". The Book of Psalms is part of the third section of the Hebrew Bible, and a book of the Christian Old Testament. In the slightly different numbering system used in the Greek Septuagint and Latin Vulgate translations of the Bible, this psalm is Psalm 135. In Latin, it is known by the incipit, "Confitemini Domino quoniam bonus" (Ancient Greek: Έξομολογεῖσθε τῷ Κυρίῳ). It is sometimes referred to as "The Great Hallel". The Jerusalem Bible calls it a "Litany of Thanksgiving". It is notable for the refrain which forms the second half of each verse, translated as "For His mercy endures forever" in the New King James Version, or "for his steadfast love endures for ever" in the Revised Standard Version.

Psalm 136 is used in both Jewish and Christian liturgies. It has been paraphrased in hymns, and was set to music. The Hebrew text of the Book of Sirach contains a hymn of thanksgiving inserted after Sirach 51:12 which is "an obvious imitation" of this psalm.

== Structure ==
The psalm is arranged in well marked groups of three verses to the end of verse 18, after which follow two groups of four verses.

== Uses ==
=== Judaism ===
The term Great Hallel (Hallel HaGadol), meaning "great praise", is used to refer to Psalm 136. It is called "great" to differentiate it from the Egyptian Hallel, another prayer of praise comprising psalms 113 to 118. In the Talmud, opinions vary whether Great Hallel includes only Psalm 136, or else chapters 135-136, or else chapters 134-136; the accepted opinion is that it only includes 136.

- The Hebrew text of the Book of Sirach contains a hymn of thanksgiving inserted after Sirach 51:12 which is "an obvious imitation" of this psalm, see Sirach 51 in the New American Bible Revised Edition.
- This psalm is recited in its entirety during the Pesukei Dezimra on Shabbat, Yom Tov, and - in many communities - on Hoshana Rabbah. It is also recited towards the end of the Hallel section of the Passover seder.
- It is recited on the eighth day of Passover in some traditions.
- Verse 1 is part of the final paragraph of Birkat Hamazon.
- Verse 4 is recited when opening the Hakafot on Simchat Torah in both the Eastern and Western Ashkenazic rites (which have different orders for this prayer).
- Verse 6 is recited in Roka Ha'Aretz Al HaMayim of Birkat HaShachar.
- Verse 7 is part of Likel Barukh in Blessings before the Shema.
- Verse 25 is part of the opening paragraph of Birkat Hamazon.

Verse 1,

[They] worshiped and gave thanks to the Lord, saying,
"For he is good, for his steadfast love endures forever"

was recited at Solomon's dedication of the Temple; Charles Spurgeon suggests that the whole psalm was sung.

=== Christianity ===
==== Eastern Orthodoxy ====
- Along with Psalm 135 (LXX numbers as 134 and 135 respectively) this psalm is called the Polyeleos or translated to "Many Mercies", named such after the refrain used "for His mercy endures forever". The Polyeleos is sung at Orthros (Matins) of a Feast Day and at Vigils. In some Slavic traditions and on Mount Athos it is read every Sunday at Orthros.
- On Mount Athos, it is considered one of the most joyful periods of Matins-Liturgy, and the highest point of Matins. In Athonite practice, all the candles are lit, and the chandeliers are made to swing as the Psalms are sung, it is also accompanied by a joyful peal of the bells and censing of the church, sometimes with a hand censer which has many bells on it.
- At vigils, it accompanies the opening of the Royal Doors and a great censing of the nave by the Priest(s) or Deacon(s).

==== Coptic Orthodoxy ====
This psalm is chanted as the second Hoos (or second Canticle) of the Tasbeha, the Midnight Praise of the Coptic Orthodox Church.

=== Literature ===
John Milton wrote an English paraphrase of Psalm 136 among his poems of 1645.

=== Musical settings ===
John Milton paraphrased the beginning in the hymn "Let us with a gladsome mind" in 1623. The German round, "Danket, danket dem Herrn" from the 18th century is also a paraphrase of verse 1.

Heinrich Schütz composed two setting in German in his Psalmen Davids in 1618, SWV 32 and SWV 45. He also composed a metred paraphrase of the psalm in German, "Danket dem Herren, gebt ihn Ehr", SWV 241, for the Becker Psalter, published first in 1628.

Verses 1-15 were set by Roxanna Panufnik as "Love Endureth" in 2012. "Forever", written by Chris Tomlin in 2001, also draws heavily on this psalm for its lyrics.

== Text ==
The following table shows the Hebrew text of the Psalm with vowels, alongside the Koine Greek text in the Septuagint and the English translation from the King James Version. Note that the meaning can slightly differ between these versions, as the Septuagint and the Masoretic Text come from different textual traditions. (Note: A 1917 translation directly from Hebrew to English by the Jewish Publication Society can be found here or here, and an 1844 translation directly from the Septuagint by L. C. L. Brenton can be found here. Both translations are in the public domain.) In the Septuagint, this psalm is numbered Psalm 135.

#	Hebrew	English	Greek
1	הוֹד֣וּ לַיהֹוָ֣ה כִּי־ט֑וֹב כִּ֖י לְעוֹלָ֣ם חַסְדּֽוֹ׃	O give thanks unto the LORD; for he is good: for his mercy endureth for ever.	᾿Αλληλούΐα. - ΕΞΟΜΟΛΟΓΕΙΣΘΕ τῷ Κυρίῳ, ὅτι ἀγαθός, ὅτι εἰς τὸν αἰῶνα τὸ ἔλεος αὐτοῦ·
2	ה֭וֹדוּ לֵאלֹהֵ֣י הָאֱלֹהִ֑ים כִּ֖י לְעוֹלָ֣ם חַסְדּֽוֹ׃	O give thanks unto the God of gods: for his mercy endureth for ever.	ἐξομολογεῖσθε τῷ Θεῷ τῶν θεῶν, ὅτι εἰς τὸν αἰῶνα τὸ ἔλεος αὐτοῦ·
3	ה֭וֹדוּ לַאֲדֹנֵ֣י הָאֲדֹנִ֑ים כִּ֖י לְעוֹלָ֣ם חַסְדּֽוֹ׃	O give thanks to the Lord of lords: for his mercy endureth for ever.	ἐξομολογεῖσθε τῷ Κυρίῳ τῶν κυρίων, ὅτι εἰς τὸν αἰῶνα τὸ ἔλεος αὐτοῦ·
4	לְעֹ֘שֵׂ֤ה נִפְלָא֣וֹת גְּדֹל֣וֹת לְבַדּ֑וֹ כִּ֖י לְעוֹלָ֣ם חַסְדּֽוֹ׃	To him who alone doeth great wonders: for his mercy endureth for ever.	τῷ ποιήσαντι θαυμάσια μεγάλα μόνῳ, ὅτι εἰς τὸν αἰῶνα τὸ ἔλεος αὐτοῦ·
5	לְעֹשֵׂ֣ה הַ֭שָּׁמַיִם בִּתְבוּנָ֑ה כִּ֖י לְעוֹלָ֣ם חַסְדּֽוֹ׃	To him that by wisdom made the heavens: for his mercy endureth for ever.	τῷ ποιήσαντι τοὺς οὐρανοὺς ἐν συνέσει, ὅτι εἰς τὸν αἰῶνα τὸ ἔλεος αὐτοῦ·
6	לְרֹקַ֣ע הָ֭אָרֶץ עַל־הַמָּ֑יִם כִּ֖י לְעוֹלָ֣ם חַסְדּֽוֹ׃	To him that stretched out the earth above the waters: for his mercy endureth for ever.	τῷ στερεώσαντι τὴν γῆν ἐπὶ τῶν ὑδάτων, ὅτι εἰς τὸν αἰῶνα τὸ ἔλεος αὐτοῦ·
7	לְ֭עֹשֵׂה אוֹרִ֣ים גְּדֹלִ֑ים כִּ֖י לְעוֹלָ֣ם חַסְדּֽוֹ׃	To him that made great lights: for his mercy endureth for ever:	τῷ ποιήσαντι φῶτα μεγάλα μόνῳ, ὅτι εἰς τὸν αἰῶνα τὸ ἔλεος αὐτοῦ·
8	אֶת־הַ֭שֶּׁמֶשׁ לְמֶמְשֶׁ֣לֶת בַּיּ֑וֹם כִּ֖י לְעוֹלָ֣ם חַסְדּֽוֹ׃	The sun to rule by day: for his mercy endureth for ever:	τὸν ἥλιον εἰς ἐξουσίαν τῆς ἡμέρας, ὅτι εἰς τὸν αἰῶνα τὸ ἔλεος αὐτοῦ·
9	אֶת־הַיָּרֵ֣חַ וְ֭כוֹכָבִים לְמֶמְשְׁל֣וֹת בַּלָּ֑יְלָה כִּ֖י לְעוֹלָ֣ם חַסְדּֽוֹ׃	The moon and stars to rule by night: for his mercy endureth for ever.	τὴν σελήνην καὶ τοὺς ἀστέρας εἰς ἐξουσίαν τῆς νυκτός, ὅτι εἰς τὸν αἰῶνα τὸ ἔλεος αὐτοῦ·
10	לְמַכֵּ֣ה מִ֭צְרַיִם בִּבְכוֹרֵיהֶ֑ם כִּ֖י לְעוֹלָ֣ם חַסְדּֽוֹ׃	To him that smote Egypt in their firstborn: for his mercy endureth for ever:	τῷ πατάξαντι Αἴγυπτον σὺν τοῖς πρωτοτόκοις αὐτῶν, ὅτι εἰς τὸν αἰῶνα τὸ ἔλεος αὐτοῦ,
11	וַיּוֹצֵ֣א יִ֭שְׂרָאֵל מִתּוֹכָ֑ם כִּ֖י לְעוֹלָ֣ם חַסְדּֽוֹ׃	And brought out Israel from among them: for his mercy endureth for ever:	καὶ ἐξαγαγόντι τὸν ᾿Ισραὴλ ἐκ μέσου αὐτῶν, ὅτι εἰς τὸν αἰῶνα τὸ ἔλεος αὐτοῦ,
12	בְּיָ֣ד חֲ֭זָקָה וּבִזְר֣וֹעַ נְטוּיָ֑ה כִּ֖י לְעוֹלָ֣ם חַסְדּֽוֹ׃	With a strong hand, and with a stretched out arm: for his mercy endureth for ever.	ἐν χειρὶ κραταιᾷ καὶ ἐν βραχίονι ὑψηλῷ, ὅτι εἰς τὸν αἰῶνα τὸ ἔλεος αὐτοῦ·
13	לְגֹזֵ֣ר יַם־ס֭וּף לִגְזָרִ֑ים כִּ֖י לְעוֹלָ֣ם חַסְדּֽוֹ׃	To him which divided the Red sea into parts: for his mercy endureth for ever:	τῷ καταδιελόντι τὴν ᾿Ερυθρὰν θάλασσαν εἰς διαιρέσεις, ὅτι εἰς τὸν αἰῶνα τὸ ἔλεος αὐτοῦ·
14	וְהֶעֱבִ֣יר יִשְׂרָאֵ֣ל בְּתוֹכ֑וֹ כִּ֖י לְעוֹלָ֣ם חַסְדּֽוֹ׃	And made Israel to pass through the midst of it: for his mercy endureth for ever:	καὶ διαγαγόντι τὸν ᾿Ισραὴλ διὰ μέσου αὐτῆς, ὅτι εἰς τὸν αἰῶνα τὸ ἔλεος αὐτοῦ,
15	וְנִ֘עֵ֤ר פַּרְעֹ֣ה וְחֵיל֣וֹ בְיַם־ס֑וּף כִּ֖י לְעוֹלָ֣ם חַסְדּֽוֹ׃	But overthrew Pharaoh and his host in the Red sea: for his mercy endureth for ever.	καὶ ἐκτινάξαντι Φαραὼ καὶ τὴν δύναμιν αὐτοῦ εἰς θάλασσαν ᾿Ερυθράν, ὅτι εἰς τὸν αἰῶνα τὸ ἔλεος αὐτοῦ·
16	לְמוֹלִ֣יךְ עַ֭מּוֹ בַּמִּדְבָּ֑ר כִּ֖י לְעוֹלָ֣ם חַסְדּֽוֹ׃	To him which led his people through the wilderness: for his mercy endureth for ever.	τῷ διαγαγόντι τὸν λαὸν αὐτοῦ ἐν τῇ ἐρήμῳ, ὅτι εἰς τὸν αἰῶνα τὸ ἔλεος αὐτοῦ·
17	לְ֭מַכֵּה מְלָכִ֣ים גְּדֹלִ֑ים כִּ֖י לְעוֹלָ֣ם חַסְדּֽוֹ׃	To him which smote great kings: for his mercy endureth for ever:	τῷ πατάξαντι βασιλεῖς μεγάλους, ὅτι εἰς τὸν αἰῶνα τὸ ἔλεος αὐτοῦ,
18	וַֽ֭יַּהֲרֹג מְלָכִ֣ים אַדִּירִ֑ים כִּ֖י לְעוֹלָ֣ם חַסְדּֽוֹ׃	And slew famous kings: for his mercy endureth for ever:	καὶ ἀποκτείναντι βασιλεῖς κραταιούς, ὅτι εἰς τὸν αἰῶνα τὸ ἔλεος αὐτοῦ,
19	לְ֭סִיחוֹן מֶ֣לֶךְ הָאֱמֹרִ֑י כִּ֖י לְעוֹלָ֣ם חַסְדּֽוֹ׃	Sihon king of the Amorites: for his mercy endureth for ever:	τὸν Σηὼν βασιλέα τῶν ᾿Αμορραίων, ὅτι εἰς τὸν αἰῶνα τὸ ἔλεος αὐτοῦ,
20	וּ֭לְעוֹג מֶ֣לֶךְ הַבָּשָׁ֑ן כִּ֖י לְעוֹלָ֣ם חַסְדּֽוֹ׃	And Og the king of Bashan: for his mercy endureth for ever:	καὶ τὸν ῍Ωγ βασιλέα τῆς Βασάν, ὅτι εἰς τὸν αἰῶνα τὸ ἔλεος αὐτοῦ,
21	וְנָתַ֣ן אַרְצָ֣ם לְנַחֲלָ֑ה כִּ֖י לְעוֹלָ֣ם חַסְדּֽוֹ׃	And gave their land for an heritage: for his mercy endureth for ever:	καὶ δόντι τὴν γῆν αὐτῶν κληρονομίαν, ὅτι εἰς τὸν αἰῶνα τὸ ἔλεος αὐτοῦ,
22	נַ֭חֲלָה לְיִשְׂרָאֵ֣ל עַבְדּ֑וֹ כִּ֖י לְעוֹלָ֣ם חַסְדּֽוֹ׃	Even an heritage unto Israel his servant: for his mercy endureth for ever.	κληρονομίαν ᾿Ισραὴλ δούλῳ αὐτοῦ, ὅτι εἰς τὸν αἰῶνα τὸ ἔλεος αὐτοῦ.
23	שֶׁ֭בְּשִׁפְלֵנוּ זָ֣כַר לָ֑נוּ כִּ֖י לְעוֹלָ֣ם חַסְדּֽוֹ׃	Who remembered us in our low estate: for his mercy endureth for ever:	ὅτι ἐν τῇ ταπεινώσει ἡμῶν ἐμνήσθη ἡμῶν ὁ Κύριος, ὅτι εἰς τὸν αἰῶνα τὸ ἔλεος αὐτοῦ,
24	וַיִּפְרְקֵ֥נוּ מִצָּרֵ֑ינוּ כִּ֖י לְעוֹלָ֣ם חַסְדּֽוֹ׃	And hath redeemed us from our enemies: for his mercy endureth for ever.	καὶ ἐλυτρώσατο ἡμᾶς ἐκ τῶν ἐχθρῶν ἡμῶν, ὅτι εἰς τὸν αἰῶνα τὸ ἔλεος αὐτοῦ·
25	נֹתֵ֣ן לֶ֭חֶם לְכׇל־בָּשָׂ֑ר כִּ֖י לְעוֹלָ֣ם חַסְדּֽוֹ׃	Who giveth food to all flesh: for his mercy endureth for ever.	ὁ διδοὺς τροφὴν πάσῃ σαρκί, ὅτι εἰς τὸν αἰῶνα τὸ ἔλεος αὐτοῦ.
26	ה֭וֹדוּ לְאֵ֣ל הַשָּׁמָ֑יִם כִּ֖י לְעוֹלָ֣ם חַסְדּֽוֹ׃	O give thanks unto the God of heaven: for his mercy endureth for ever.	ἐξομολογεῖσθε τῷ Θεῷ τοῦ οὐρανοῦ, ὅτι εἰς τὸν αἰῶνα τὸ ἔλεος αὐτοῦ.
