= Psalm 34 =

Biblical psalm

- "I will bless the LORD at all times"
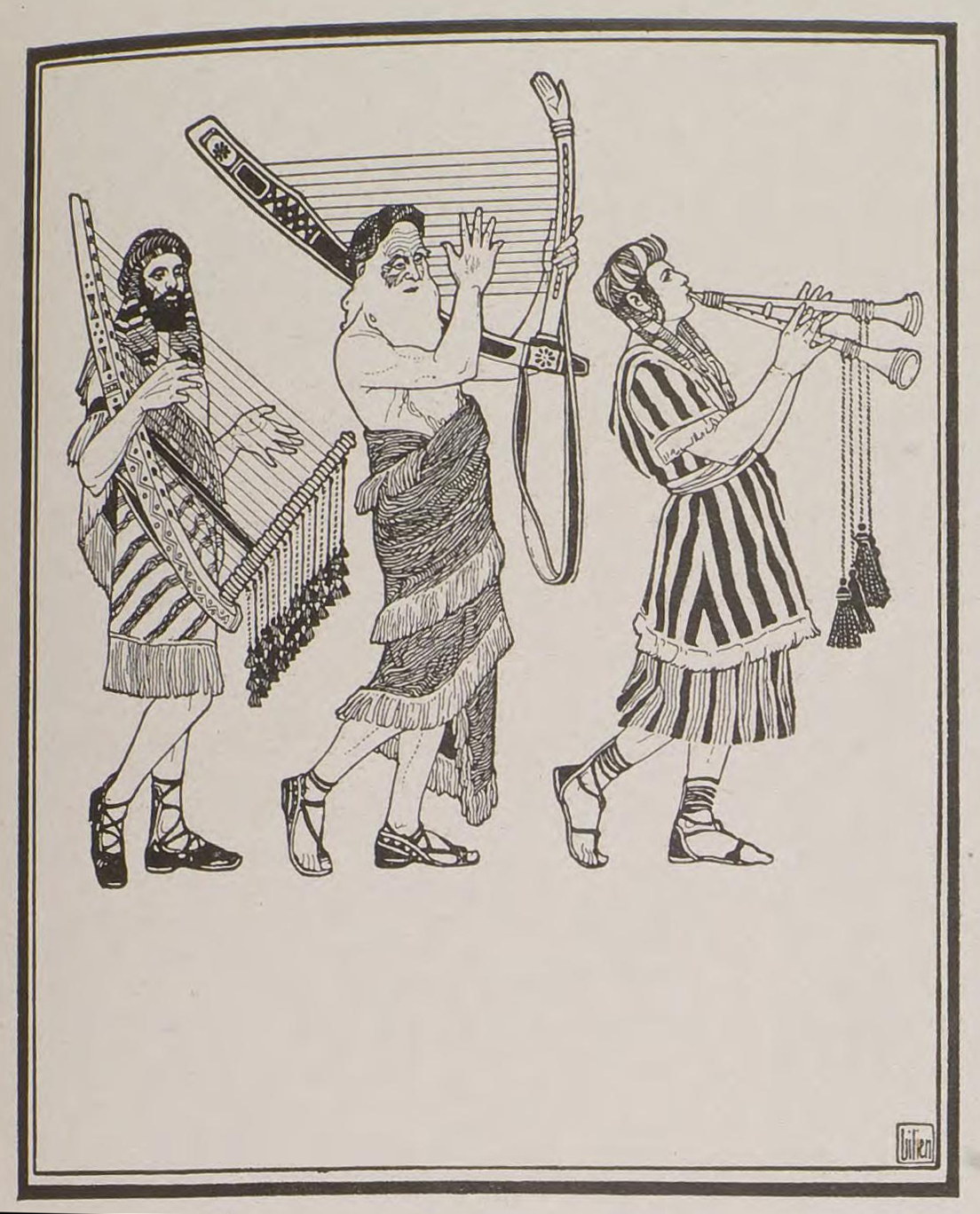
- Psalm 34 by Ephraim Moses Lilien
- Other name: Psalm 33; "Benedicam Dominum in omni tempore"
- Written: by David
- Language: Hebrew (original)

Psalm 34
- ← Psalm 33 Psalm 35 →
- Book: Book of Psalms
- Hebrew Bible part: Ketuvim
- Order in the Hebrew part: 1
- Category: Sifrei Emet
- Christian Bible part: Old Testament
- Order in the Christian part: 19

Psalm 34 is the 34th psalm of the Book of Psalms, beginning in English in the King James Version: "I will bless the LORD at all times: his praise shall continually be in my mouth." The Book of Psalms is part of the third section of the Hebrew Bible, and a book of the Christian Old Testament. In the slightly different numbering system used in the Greek Septuagint and Latin Vulgate translations of the Bible, this psalm is Psalm 33. In Latin, it is known as "Benedicam Dominum in omni tempore".

Psalm 34 is attributed to David. The Psalm's subtitle, A Psalm of David when he pretended madness before Abimelech, who drove him away, and he departed, derives from when David was living with the Philistines, but the account of this event in 1 Samuel 21 refers to the king as Achish, not Abimelech; however "Abimelech" may merely be a title, literally meaning "father of a king". The psalm is an acrostic poem in the Hebrew alphabet, one of a series of songs of thanksgiving. It is the first Psalm which describes angels (mal’āḵîm) as guardians of the righteous.

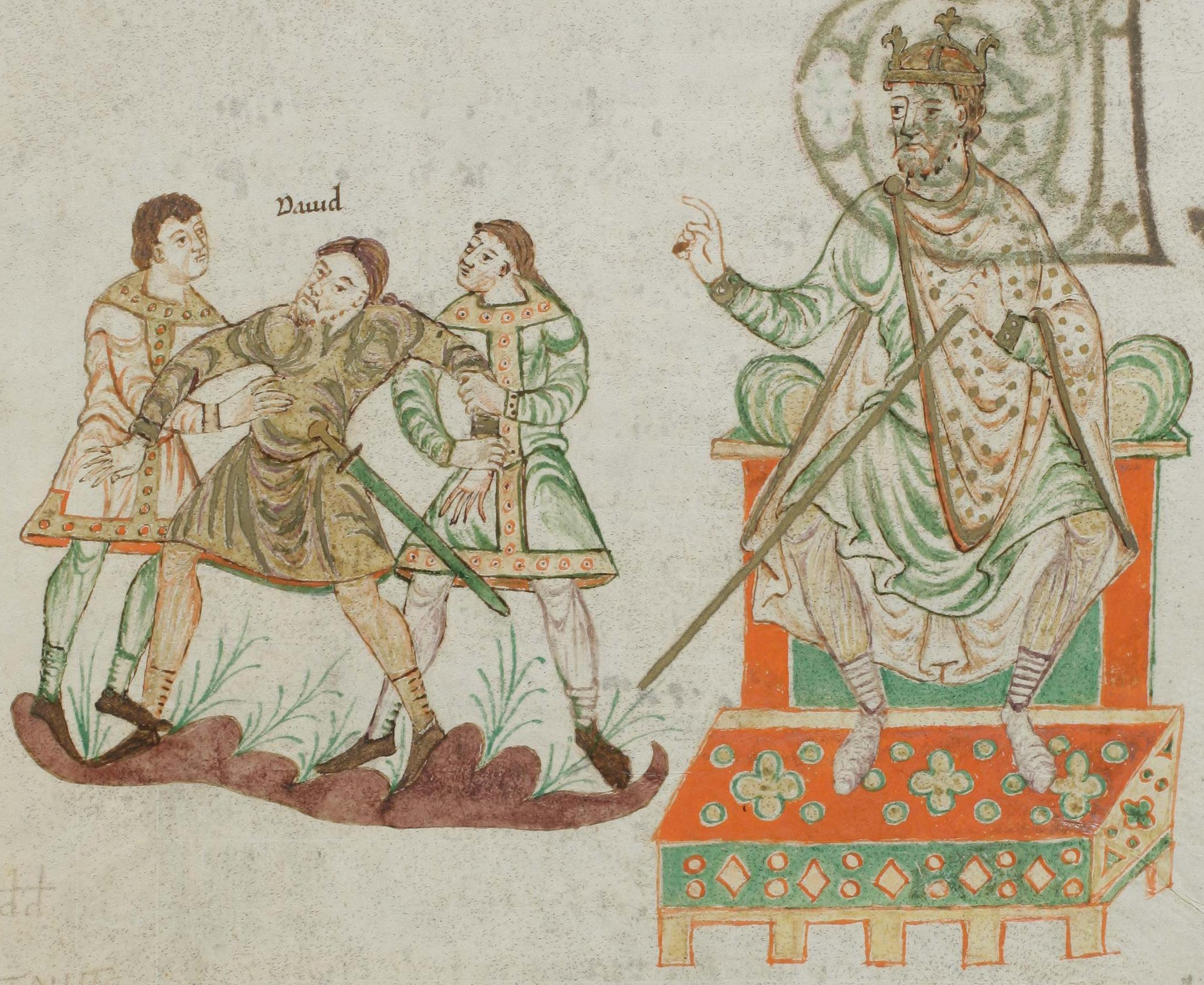
Art from the Golden Psalter of St. Gallen, showing David feigning madness before Achish/Abimelech.

The psalm forms a regular part of Jewish, Catholic, Lutheran, Anglican and other Protestant liturgies. It has inspired hymns based on it, and has been set to music.

== Structure ==
The psalm could be structured in the following manner:

1. Vers 2-4: Hymn introduction
2. Vers 5: Basic praising, preaching the fate of the Psalmist
3. Vers 6-11: teaching, which is evident from his fate
4. Vers 12-22: didactic poem 1
5. Vers 13-15: Question - answer:
6. Vers 16-22: Collection of wise sayings.

It is an acrostic poem in the Hebrew alphabet, with each letter beginning a verse in sequential order; the lone exception is waw (ו), which begins the second clause of verse six. The first and last verses are outside the acrostic scheme. The Old Testament scholar Hermann Gunkel felt that the acrostic nature of the Psalm made any historical, or theological analysis impossible. This psalm is an acrostic of confidence, as is Psalm 25, with which it has many similarities.

== Uses ==
=== New Testament ===
Some verses of Psalm 34 are referenced in the New Testament:

- Verse 8 is quoted by St. Peter in 1 Peter 2:3.
- Verses 12-16 are cited in 1 Peter 3:10–12.
- Verse 18 is paraphrased in Matthew 5:3.
- Verse 20 is alluded to in John 19:36.

=== Judaism ===
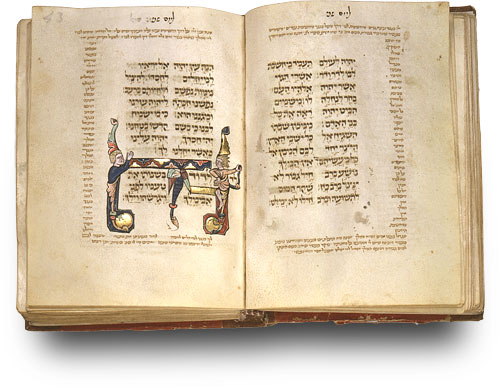
Psalm 34 in the Parma Psalter.

- Psalm 34 is recited in its entirety during Pesukei Dezimra on Shabbat, Yom Tov, and - in many communities - on Hoshana Rabbah.
- Verse 4 is recited when the Torah scroll is taken out of the ark.
- Verses 10-11 are recited by Ashkenazim as part of the final paragraph of Birkat Hamazon.
- Verses 14-15 form the basis for part of the closing paragraph of the Amidah.

=== Catholicism ===
According to the Rule of St. Benedict around 530, this psalm was traditionally sung at the office of Matins on Mondays in monasteries.

Currently, in the Liturgy of the Hours, Psalm 34 is recited on Saturdays in the first and third weeks of the four weekly cycle of readings and for the holy celebrations. It is often used as a responsorial psalm.

=== Coptic Orthodox Church ===
In the Agpeya, the Coptic Church's book of hours, this psalm is prayed in the office of Terce.

=== Book of Common Prayer ===
In the Church of England's Book of Common Prayer, this psalm is appointed to be read on the evening of the sixth day of the month.

== Text ==
The following table shows the Hebrew text of the Psalm with vowels, alongside the Koine Greek text in the Septuagint and the English translation from the King James Version. Note that the meaning can slightly differ between these versions, as the Septuagint and the Masoretic Text come from different textual traditions.

In the Septuagint, this psalm is numbered Psalm 33.

#	Hebrew	English	Greek
(Note: In the Jewish verse numbering, the ascription of this psalm is verse 1, and the rest of the psalm begins from verse 2. However, the Christian verse numbering does not count the ascription as a separate verse.)	לְדָוִ֗ד בְּשַׁנּוֹת֣וֹ אֶת־טַ֭עְמוֹ לִפְנֵ֣י אֲבִימֶ֑לֶךְ וַ֝יְגָרְשֵׁ֗הוּ וַיֵּלַֽךְ׃	(A Psalm of David, when he changed his behaviour before Abimelech; who drove him away, and he departed.)	Τῷ Δαυΐδ, ὁπότε ἠλλοίωσε τὸ πρόσωπον αὐτοῦ ἐναντίον ᾿Αβιμέλεχ, καὶ ἀπέλυσεν αὐτόν, καὶ ἀπῆλθεν. -
1	אֲבָרְכָ֣ה אֶת־יְהֹוָ֣ה בְּכׇל־עֵ֑ת תָּ֝מִ֗יד תְּֽהִלָּת֥וֹ בְּפִֽי׃	I will bless the LORD at all times: his praise shall continually be in my mouth.	ΕΥΛΟΓΗΣΩ τὸν Κύριον ἐν παντὶ καιρῷ, διὰ παντὸς ἡ αἴνεσις αὐτοῦ ἐν τῷ στόματί μου.
2	בַּ֭יהֹוָה תִּתְהַלֵּ֣ל נַפְשִׁ֑י יִשְׁמְע֖וּ עֲנָוִ֣ים וְיִשְׂמָֽחוּ׃	My soul shall make her boast in the LORD: the humble shall hear thereof, and be glad.	ἐν τῷ Κυρίῳ ἐπαινεθήσεται ἡ ψυχή μου· ἀκουσάτωσαν πρᾳεῖς, καὶ εὐφρανθήτωσαν.
3	גַּדְּל֣וּ לַיהֹוָ֣ה אִתִּ֑י וּנְרוֹמְמָ֖ה שְׁמ֣וֹ יַחְדָּֽו׃	O magnify the LORD with me, and let us exalt his name together.	μεγαλύνατε τὸν Κύριον σὺν ἐμοί, καὶ ὑψώσωμεν τὸ ὄνομα αὐτοῦ ἐπὶ τὸ αὐτό.
4	דָּרַ֣שְׁתִּי אֶת־יְהֹוָ֣ה וְעָנָ֑נִי וּמִכׇּל־מְ֝גוּרוֹתַ֗י הִצִּילָֽנִי׃	I sought the LORD, and he heard me, and delivered me from all my fears.	ἐξεζήτησα τὸν Κύριον, καὶ ἐπήκουσέ μου καὶ ἐκ πασῶν τῶν θλίψεών μου ἐῤῥύσατό με.
5	הִבִּ֣יטוּ אֵלָ֣יו וְנָהָ֑רוּ וּ֝פְנֵיהֶ֗ם אַל־יֶחְפָּֽרוּ׃	They looked unto him, and were lightened: and their faces were not ashamed.	προσέλθετε πρὸς αὐτὸν καὶ φωτίσθητε, καὶ τὰ πρόσωπα ὑμῶν οὐ μὴ καταισχυνθῇ.
6	זֶ֤ה עָנִ֣י קָ֭רָא וַיהֹוָ֣ה שָׁמֵ֑עַ וּמִכׇּל־צָ֝רוֹתָ֗יו הוֹשִׁיעֽוֹ׃	This poor man cried, and the LORD heard him, and saved him out of all his troubles.	οὗτος ὁ πτωχὸς ἐκέκραξε καὶ ὁ Κύριος εἰσήκουσεν αὐτοῦ καὶ ἐκ πασῶν τῶν θλίψεων αὐτοῦ ἔσωσεν αὐτόν.
7	חֹנֶ֤ה מַלְאַךְ־יְהֹוָ֓ה סָ֘בִ֤יב לִירֵאָ֗יו וַֽיְחַלְּצֵֽם׃	The angel of the LORD encampeth round about them that fear him, and delivereth them.	παρεμβαλεῖ ἄγγελος Κυρίου κύκλῳ τῶν φοβουμένων αὐτὸν καὶ ῥύσεται αὐτούς.
8	טַעֲמ֣וּ וּ֭רְאוּ כִּֽי־ט֣וֹב יְהֹוָ֑ה אַֽשְׁרֵ֥י הַ֝גֶּ֗בֶר יֶחֱסֶה־בּֽוֹ׃	O taste and see that the LORD is good: blessed is the man that trusteth in him.	γεύσασθε καὶ ἴδετε ὅτι χρηστὸς ὁ Κύριος· μακάριος ἀνήρ, ὃς ἐλπίζει ἐπ᾿ αὐτόν.
9	יְר֣אוּ אֶת־יְהֹוָ֣ה קְדֹשָׁ֑יו כִּי־אֵ֥ין מַ֝חְס֗וֹר לִירֵאָֽיו׃	O fear the LORD, ye his saints: for there is no want to them that fear him.	φοβήθητε τὸν Κύριον πάντες οἱ ἅγιοι αὐτοῦ, ὅτι οὐκ ἔστιν ὑστέρημα τοῖς φοβουμένοις αὐτόν.
10	כְּ֭פִירִים רָשׁ֣וּ וְרָעֵ֑בוּ וְדֹרְשֵׁ֥י יְ֝הֹוָ֗ה לֹא־יַחְסְר֥וּ כׇל־טֽוֹב׃	The young lions do lack, and suffer hunger: but they that seek the LORD shall not want any good thing.	πλούσιοι ἐπτώχευσαν καὶ ἐπείνασαν, οἱ δὲ ἐκζητοῦντες τὸν Κύριον οὐκ ἐλαττωθήσονται παντὸς ἀγαθοῦ. (διάψαλμα).
11	לְֽכוּ־בָ֭נִים שִׁמְעוּ־לִ֑י יִֽרְאַ֥ת יְ֝הֹוָ֗ה אֲלַמֶּדְכֶֽם׃	Come, ye children, hearken unto me: I will teach you the fear of the LORD.	δεῦτε, τέκνα, ἀκούσατέ μου· φόβον Κυρίου διδάξω ὑμᾶς.
12	מִֽי־הָ֭אִישׁ הֶחָפֵ֣ץ חַיִּ֑ים אֹהֵ֥ב יָ֝מִ֗ים לִרְא֥וֹת טֽוֹב׃	What man is he that desireth life, and loveth many days, that he may see good?	τίς ἐστιν ἄνθρωπος ὁ θέλων ζωήν, ἀγαπῶν ἡμέρας ἰδεῖν ἀγαθάς;
13	נְצֹ֣ר לְשׁוֹנְךָ֣ מֵרָ֑ע וּ֝שְׂפָתֶ֗יךָ מִדַּבֵּ֥ר מִרְמָֽה׃	Keep thy tongue from evil, and thy lips from speaking guile.	παῦσον τὴν γλῶσσάν σου ἀπὸ κακοῦ καὶ χείλη σου τοῦ μὴ λαλῆσαι δόλον.
14	ס֣וּר מֵ֭רָע וַעֲשֵׂה־ט֑וֹב בַּקֵּ֖שׁ שָׁל֣וֹם וְרׇדְפֵֽהוּ׃	Depart from evil, and do good; seek peace, and pursue it.	ἔκκλινον ἀπὸ κακοῦ καὶ ποίησον ἀγαθόν, ζήτησον εἰρήνην καὶ δίωξον αὐτήν.
15	עֵינֵ֣י יְ֭הֹוָה אֶל־צַדִּיקִ֑ים וְ֝אׇזְנָ֗יו אֶל־שַׁוְעָתָֽם׃	The eyes of the LORD are upon the righteous, and his ears are open unto their cry.	ὀφθαλμοὶ Κυρίου ἐπὶ δικαίους, καὶ ὦτα αὐτοῦ εἰς δέησιν αὐτῶν.
16	פְּנֵ֣י יְ֭הֹוָה בְּעֹ֣שֵׂי רָ֑ע לְהַכְרִ֖ית מֵאֶ֣רֶץ זִכְרָֽם׃	The face of the LORD is against them that do evil, to cut off the remembrance of them from the earth.	πρόσωπον δὲ Κυρίου ἐπὶ ποιοῦντας κακὰ τοῦ ἐξολοθρεῦσαι ἐκ γῆς τὸ μνημόσυνον αὐτῶν.
17	צָ֭עֲקוּ וַיהֹוָ֣ה שָׁמֵ֑עַ וּמִכׇּל־צָ֝רוֹתָ֗ם הִצִּילָֽם׃	The righteous cry, and the LORD heareth, and delivereth them out of all their troubles.	ἐκέκραξαν οἱ δίκαιοι, καὶ ὁ Κύριος εἰσήκουσεν αὐτῶν, καὶ ἐκ πασῶν τῶν θλίψεων αὐτῶν ἐῤῥύσατο αὐτούς.
18	קָר֣וֹב יְ֭הֹוָה לְנִשְׁבְּרֵי־לֵ֑ב וְֽאֶת־דַּכְּאֵי־ר֥וּחַ יוֹשִֽׁיעַ׃	The LORD is nigh unto them that are of a broken heart; and saveth such as be of a contrite spirit.	ἐγγὺς Κύριος τοῖς συντετριμμένοις τὴν καρδίαν καὶ τοὺς ταπεινοὺς τῷ πνεύματι σώσει.
19	רַ֭בּוֹת רָע֣וֹת צַדִּ֑יק וּ֝מִכֻּלָּ֗ם יַצִּילֶ֥נּוּ יְהֹוָֽה׃	Many are the afflictions of the righteous: but the LORD delivereth him out of them all.	πολλαὶ αἱ θλίψεις τῶν δικαίων, καὶ ἐκ πασῶν αὐτῶν ῥύσεται αὐτοὺς ὁ Κύριος·
20	שֹׁמֵ֥ר כׇּל־עַצְמוֹתָ֑יו אַחַ֥ת מֵ֝הֵ֗נָּה לֹ֣א נִשְׁבָּֽרָה׃	He keepeth all his bones: not one of them is broken.	φυλάσσει Κύριος πάντα τὰ ὀστᾶ αὐτῶν, ἓν ἐξ αὐτῶν οὐ συντριβήσεται.
21	תְּמוֹתֵ֣ת רָשָׁ֣ע רָעָ֑ה וְשֹׂנְאֵ֖י צַדִּ֣יק יֶאְשָֽׁמוּ׃	Evil shall slay the wicked: and they that hate the righteous shall be desolate.	θάνατος ἁμαρτωλῶν πονηρός, καὶ οἱ μισοῦντες τὸν δίκαιον πλημμελήσουσι.
22	פֹּדֶ֣ה יְ֭הֹוָה נֶ֣פֶשׁ עֲבָדָ֑יו וְלֹ֥א יֶ֝אְשְׁמ֗וּ כׇּֽל־הַחֹסִ֥ים בּֽוֹ׃	The LORD redeemeth the soul of his servants: and none of them that trust in him shall be desolate.	λυτρώσεται Κύριος ψυχὰς δούλων αὐτοῦ, καὶ οὐ μὴ πλημμελήσουσι πάντες οἱ ἐλπίζοντες ἐπ᾿ αὐτόν.

=== Verse 11 ===
Come, you children, listen to me;
I will teach you the fear of the Lord.

The psalmist is now "teacher"; "children" is the customary term for students in wisdom literature.

=== Verse 20 ===
Gaylin Schmeling, in his study for Bethany Lutheran Theological Seminary, examines this verse, which declares that the bones of the righteous remain unbroken, possibly in a symbolic sense for the redeemed counted as righteous. Jesus, being the epitome of righteousness, may be viewed with a more literal application of this idea where his bones were not broken at the cross in a Christian perspective. Additionally, the observation is made that the bones of the Passover lamb were also not broken.

== Musical settings ==
Heinrich Schütz composed a choral setting on a German metred paraphrase of Psalm 34, "Ich will bei meinem Leben rühmen den Herren mein", as part of the Becker Psalter.

Several musical settings focus on the verse 8, "Taste and see", which is suitable as music for the Eucharist. Vaughan Williams set it, titled "O taste and see", for soprano and mixed choir with organ introduction, for the Coronation of Elizabeth II in Westminster Abbey on 2 June 1953. It was included as No. 3 of the 2015 album Psalms II by Shane & Shane, and as No. of the 2017 album Fractures by Sons of Korah.

The American composer Steve Reich set part of the Hebrew text in his 1981 work Tehillim.
