= Hallel (pesukei dezimra) =

Daily verses of praise in Judaic liturgy

Hallel of pesukei dezimra a selection of six psalms recited as part of pesukei dezimra ('verses of praise') – the introduction to the daily morning service in Judaism. This "Hallel" consists of Ashrei (most of which is Psalm 145) followed by Psalms 146–150. The term Hallel, without a qualifier, generally refers to Psalms 113-118, which are recited only on festivals; for this reason the Hallel of pesukei dezimra is also known as the daily Hallel.

These psalms are recited because they are devoted entirely to the praise of God.

Originally, this was the only part of pesukei dezimra. Its recitation was considered voluntary for a long time.

== Views ==
The Babylonian Talmud relates that Rav Yosei said, "Let my portion be with those who recite Hallel every day." The Gemara then, anonymously, questions this statement quoting the Master as having said, "He who reads Hallel every day is a curser and blasphemer." The Gemara then resolves this by saying that Rav Yosei was referring to the Hallel of Pesukei deZimra, and not the Hallel of Psalms 113–118.
