= Yishtabach =

Jewish morning prayer

Yishtabach (Hebrew: יִשְׁתַּבַּח, romanized: yištabbaḥ, lit. 'Praised be [God]') is a Jewish prayer of acclamation recited at the end of Pesukei Dezimra (פְּסוּקֵי דְּזִמְרָא, pĕsûqê de-zimrā’) during the Jewish morning prayer service, Shacharit (שַׁחֲרִית, šaḥarit). Yishtabach precedes the recitation of Chatzi Kaddish (חֲצִי קַדִּישׁ, ḥaṣi qaddiš), which in turn precedes Barechu (בָּרְכוּ, bārĕkû). As a component of Pesukei Dezimra, Yishtabach is preceded by the recitation of Barukh She'amar (בָּרוּךְ שֶׁאָמַר, bārûkh šeʾāmar). Both Yishtabach and Barukh She’amar are blessings, which supports the notion that Pesukei Dezimra is a single, unified prayer for praising God. The author of Yishtabach is unknown; tradition attributes it to Solomon, as the initial letters of words 2–5 form an acronym of his Hebrew-language name "שְׁלֹמֹה" (Shlomó).

The blessing highlights the number fifteen: fifteen expressions of praise at the start and fifteen words in the closing line. This alludes to a divine name of God, Yah (Biblical Hebrew: יָהּ, romanized: Yāh), that, in Gematria, is assigned a value of fifteen; there are also fifteen Songs of Ascent in the book of Psalms (Psalms 120–134). Rabbi Ron Isaacs argues that there are two themes of Yishtabach: God's power and might are deserving of praise and adoration, and that one must continually praise God.

In the Ashkenazic rite, Yishtabach is usually recited while standing. This practice follows a ruling made in the Mishnah Berurah of standing during Barukh She’amar, and since Yishtabach concludes Pesukei Dezimra, they are recited in the same manner. On Shabbat, some Jewish communities, regardless of their rite, sit during the recitation of Yishtabach. In most Sephardic communities, the blessing is always recited while seated.

== Text of Yishtabach ==
The text of Yishtabach in Nusach Ashkenaz is below:

English translation	Transliteration	Aramaic/Hebrew
May Your Name be praised forever, our King,	Yishtabach shimcha la'ad malkeinu	יִשְׁתַּבַּח שִׁמְךָ לָעַד מַלְכֵּנוּ
the God, the great and holy King in Heaven and on Earth.	ha'eil hamelech hagadol vehakadosh bashamayim uva'aretz.	הָאֵל הַמֶּלֶךְ הַגָּדוֹל וְהַקָּדוֹשׁ, בַּשָּׁמַיִם וּבָאָרֶץ
Because to You it is fitting, O LORD, our God, and God of our ancestors	Ki lecha na'eh adonai eloheinu v'eilohei avoteinu	כִּי לְךָ נָאֶה יְיָ אֱלֹהֵינוּ וֵאלֹהֵי אֲבוֹתֵינוּ
[to offer] song and praise, acclamations and hymns, power and dominion, triumph, greatness and strength, praise and splendor, holiness and sovereignty, blessings and thanksgivings, from this time and forever.	shir ushvacha halleil vezimra oz umemshalla netzach gedula ugvura tehila vetif'eret kedusha umalchut berachot vehoda'ot mei'atta ve'ad olam.	שִׁיר וּשְׁבָחָה, הַלֵּל וְזִמְרָה, עֹז וּמֶמְשָׁלָה נֶצַח, גְּדֻלָּה וּגְבוּרָה, תְּהִלָּה, וְתִפְאֶרֶת, קְדֻשָּׁה, וּמַלְכוּת בְּרָכוֹת וְהוֹדָאוֹת מֵעַתָּה וְעַד עוֹלָם.
Blessed are You, LORD, God-King great in praises, God of thanksgivings, Master of wonders,	Baruch atta adonai eil melech gadol batishbachot eil hahoda'ot adon hanifla'ot	בָּרוּךְ אַתָּה יְיָ, אֵל מֶלֶךְ גָּדוֹל בַּתִּשְׁבָּחוֹת, אֵל הַהוֹדָאוֹת, אֲדוֹן הַנִּפְלָאוֹת,
Who chooses musical songs of praise, King, God, lifegiver of the world.	habocheir beshirei zimra melech eil, chei ha'olamim.	הַבּוֹחֵר בְּשִׁירֵי זִמְרָה, מֶלֶךְ אֵל חֵי הָעוֹלָמִים.
