= O taste and see =

1953 motet by Ralph Vaughan Williams

"O taste and see" is a motet composed by Ralph Vaughan Williams in 1953 for the coronation of Elizabeth II. It is a setting of Psalm 34. It was also sung at Elizabeth II's funeral.
