= Nishmat =

Jewish prayer

Nishmat (Hebrew: נִשְׁמַת or Nishmat Kol Chai 'the soul of every living thing') is a Jewish prayer that is recited during Pesukei D'Zimrah between the Song of the Sea and Yishtabach on Shabbat and Yom Tov. It is also recited during the Passover seder.

== Shochen Ad ==
Shochen Ad, שׁוֹכֵן עַד (Translated as He Who abides forever or He Who dwells in eternity) is a short prayer which is embedded in Ashkenazi texts of Nishmat. Its text is based on Isaiah 57:15.

Shochen Ad is notable because it marks the beginning of the service for the chazzan of the Shacharit on Shabbat. (In the Sephardic tradition, which does not recite Shochen Ad, the chazzan begins at Shav'at Aniyim (שַׁוְעַת עֲנִיִים) instead.)

On the Shalosh regalim, there are a variety of customs: According to the Eastern Ashkenazic rite, the chazzan begins the service on the previous verse known as Hakel B'tzatzumot on all regalim, signifying miracles God performed associated with these holidays. According to the Western Ashkenazic rite, the chazzan begins ha-gibur la-nezach on Passover, Hakel B'tzatzumot on Shavuot and ha-gadol bi-khvot shemecha on Sukkot. On the High Holidays, the chazzan begins on the word Hamelekh (המלך) within that verse, as during these days, an emphasis is placed on recognition of God as King. It is also described in Sefer HaChaim that loudly chanting the word Hamelekh has the effect of driving away accusers from the throne of judgement. Additionally, the letter ה is dropped off the word היושב, alluding to the fact that now God is sitting on the throne.

== Befi Yesharim ==
After Shochen Ad are four lines of three verses each. The second word in each of these verses begin with the Hebrew letters י,צ,ח,ק, forming the acronym יצחק (Yitzchak, Isaac). Furthermore, in the Sephardic siddur, and on Rosh Hashanah and Yom Kippur among Ashkenazim, the third words from each verse are ordered so the third letters of each of these words in order spell the name רבקה (Rivka, Rebecca). According to some, these acronyms suggest that the author of the text was a man named Yitzchak married to a Rivkah. According to others, the references are to the Biblical Isaac and Rebecca, alluding to how Isaac and Rebecca (from the Book of Genesis) prayed together to have children. While Machzor Vitry does not have the Rivkah acronym, surviving texts from the Cairo Geniza do have it.

== Themes and ideas ==
It is prized by halakhic authorities because the concepts covered in this prayer are basic to halakha. Nishmat is considered one of the masterpieces of Jewish liturgy. It is seen as a journey of self-discovery, describing God as a source of prayer.

Nishmat and Yishtabach are in some ways considered to be one long blessing, abridged just to Yishtabach on weekdays when there is no time to recite the entire prayer.

In this prayer, the word Nishmat (the combining form of Nishmah נִשְׁמָה 'breath') that begins the prayer is related to the word neshama (נְשָׁמָה 'soul'), suggesting that the soul is part of the breath of all life. The theme of the prayer is the uniqueness of God.

Some hold that answers to certain issues of Jewish law (halakha) can be derived from the prayer Nishmat. The commandment "Do not lie idly by the blood of your neighbor" requires a person to rescue another s/he sees is in danger. But from Nishmat, it can be seen that one who is not physically present where the danger is taking place is exempt from performing any rescue action. Some examples of this include the obligation to rescue a person from a burning building in one's own location, but an exemption from the obligation to donate an organ when doing so can save a life (though doing so is still permitted).

The opening words of Nishmat ("the soul of every living thing"), as well as the phrase "creator of all souls" in some versions of Yishtabach, allude to Psalms 150:6 ("All souls shall praise God..."), which was once the final verse of Pesukei Dezimra recited before Nishmat and Yishtabach.

== Origin ==
Nishmat is believed to have been composed in the early Amoraic era or earlier. In the Talmud, Rabbi Yochanan bar Nafcha (180-279 CE) states that Nishmat should be recited during the Passover Seder after Hallel. This has been current practice at least since the Geonic period (c. 800-1000 CE). While this is the earliest known reference to the prayer, there are opinions that it may be older. The second part of the Nishmat prayer, from the words "If our mouths were as full of song as the sea...we could not sufficiently praise You O Lord our God" is cited as the text of a thanksgiving prayer for rain, attributed to Rabbi Yochanan (Talmud, b. Berakhot 59b).

Nishmat became a standard part of the liturgy by the time of Saadia Gaon. The earliest mention of it as part of the Sabbath morning service is in Seder Rav Amram written by Rav Amram Gaon in the ninth century CE. In Mishneh Torah, Maimonides (12th century CE) states that it was recited on the Sabbath in Sephardic practice. Its use on Sabbath morning was controversial in Europe during the early medieval period. Several Ashkenazic rabbinic works explicitly defended its use, including Mahzor Vitry and Kol Bo.

The exact author of the prayer is not known. Based on the acrostic arrangement in Befi Yesharim, some scholars have suggested that Nishmat was authored by a man named Yitzchak with a wife named Rivka, but others have dismissed this idea.

Some scholars have suggested that the author's name may have been Shimon (שמעון, Simon) from an acrostic within the prayer, and have considered this could be Shimon ben Shetach or perhaps the Apostle Peter, whose Hebrew name was Shimon, which would place the date of authorship in the first century C.E. The latter theory is often cited in conjunction with a rabbinic legend that Simon Peter was an agent of the Sanhedrin who infiltrated early Christianity in order to differentiate it from Judaism so that Jews would not be easily attracted to it.
