= Vayivarech David =

Jewish morning prayer

Vayivarech David (Hebrew: " וַיְבָרֶךְ דָּוִיד", "and David blessed") is a prayer recited during Shacharit (morning prayers) in pesukei dezimra. It is composed of Verses 10-13 of Chapter 29 from Chronicles Book I.

The four verses of which this paragraph is composed were uttered by David at one of the most supreme moments of his life, when he was denied the right to build the Holy Temple, but was allowed to set aside resources for its construction by his son Solomon.

The recitation of these verses was introduced in the 13th century by Rabbi Meir of Rothenburg.

There is a custom to set aside money for charity when reciting this prayer (except on Shabbat and Yom Tov). One reason suggested for this is because David set aside his contributions to the Temple at the time he blessed the entire congregation. David also mentioned only Jacob and no other patriarchs in these verses; Jacob was the only Patriarch to make a vow to tithe. In some Sephardi congregations, the charity collection box is passed around at this time during the services, and is labeled Vayivarech David.
