= Psalm 92 =

Biblical psalm

- "It is a good thing to give thanks unto the LORD"
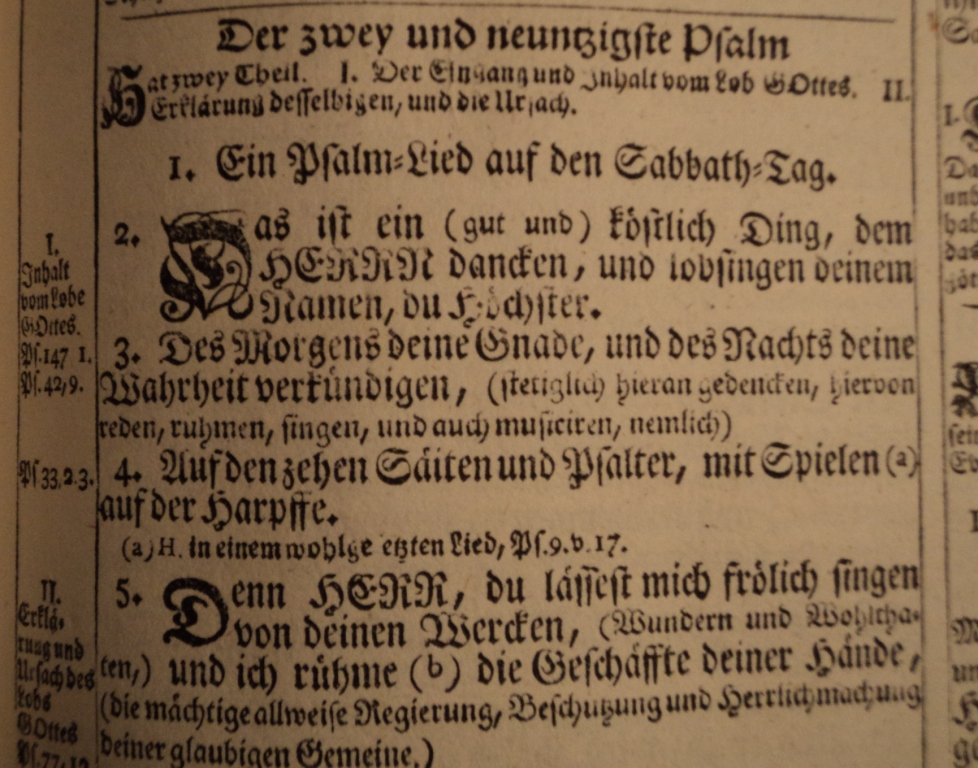
- The beginning of Psalm 92 in the German Kurfürstenbibel of 1768
- Other name: Psalm 91; "Bonum est confiteri Domino"
- Language: Hebrew (original)

Psalm 92
- ← Psalm 91 Psalm 93 →
- Book: Book of Psalms
- Hebrew Bible part: Ketuvim
- Order in the Hebrew part: 1
- Category: Sifrei Emet
- Christian Bible part: Old Testament
- Order in the Christian part: 19

Psalm 92 is the 92nd psalm of the Book of Psalms, beginning in English in the King James Version: "It is a good thing to give thanks unto the LORD". In the slightly different numbering system used in the Greek Septuagint and Latin Vulgate translations of the Hebrew Bible, this psalm is Psalm 91. In Latin, it is known as Bonum est confiteri Domino. The psalm is known as Mizmor Shir L'yom HaShabbat (Biblical Hebrew: מִזְמוֹר שִׁיר לְיוֹם הַשַּׁבָּת, lit. 'A Psalm, a Song for the Sabbath Day') in Judaism, being dedicated to Shabbat in its first verse.

The psalm forms a regular part of Jewish and Catholic liturgies. It has been set to music by, for example, Baroque composer Heinrich Schütz in German; Franz Schubert, who set it in Hebrew; and Eric Zeisl, a Jewish twentieth-century composer.

== Textual witnesses ==
Some early manuscripts containing the text of this chapter in Hebrew are of the Masoretic Text tradition, which includes the Aleppo Codex (10th century), and Codex Leningradensis (1008).

The extant palimpsest Aq^{Taylor} includes a translation into Koine Greek by Aquila of Sinope in c. 130 CE, containing verses 1–10.

== Uses ==
=== Judaism ===
Psalm 92 is recited three times during Shabbat:

- Part of Kabbalat Shabbat. This recitation officially ushers in Shabbat in most communities.
- During Pesukei Dezimra on Shabbat morning. (It is also recited in Pesukei Dezimra on Jewish holidays that occur on a weekday, although some communities omit the first verse.)
- The song of the day in the Shir Shel Yom of Shabbat.
- Some communities recite it immediately after the Torah reading at Mincha on Shabbat.

Verse 1 is part of Mishnah Tamid 7:4 and of Tamid 33b:11 in the Talmud. Verse 1—and, sometimes, verse 2—is mentioned during Yotzer ohr (יוֹצֵר אוֹר, 'Creator [of] Light'), the first of two blessings said before the recitation of Shema Yisrael (שְׁמַע יִשְׂרָאֵל) on Shabbat morning.

According to Midrash Tanhuma "Bereshit" (Genesis) 25:5, Psalm 92 was sung by Adam in Gan Eden (גַן עֶדֶן, '[the] Garden of Eden'). Adam was created on Friday, and he said this psalm on the onset of the Shabbat. It is not a psalm that speaks about the Shabbat, but one that was said on the Shabbat: this was Adam's first day of existence, and he marveled at the work of the Creator.

=== Christianity ===
In the Catholic Church, Psalm 92 is appointed to be read at Lauds (Morning Prayer) on Saturday in the fourth week of the month.

== Musical settings ==
A 1966 hymn by Rolf Schweizer, "Das ist ein köstlich Ding, dem Herren danken", paraphrases verses from Psalm 92; it became part of the German Protestant hymnal, Evangelisches Gesangbuch, as G 285.

Heinrich Schütz set the Psalm 92 in a metred version in German as part of the Becker Psalter, first published in 1628, "Es ist fürwahr ein köstlich Ding", SWV 190. The psalm was set to music by Marc-Antoine Charpentier in Latin, Bonum est confiteri Domino, H.195, for soloists, choir, 2 treble viols or violins and continuo (1687–88). Dmitry Bortniansky wrote a setting in Old Church Slavonic, his Concerto No. 18, "Blago jest ispovjedatsja" ("It Is Good To Praise the Lord"). The psalm was set by Franz Schubert in 1828 Hebrew for Salomon Sulzer, (D 953).

The Requiem Ebraico (Hebrew Requiem) (1945) by Austrian-American composer Eric Zeisl, a setting of Psalm 92 dedicated to the memory of the composer's father "and the other countless victims of the Jewish tragedy in Europe", is considered the first major work of Holocaust commemoration. American composers Mark Alburger, Gertrude Rohrer, and Margaret Vardell Sandresky have also composed musical settings. Norma Wendelburg wrote a setting in English, It is Good, for women's chorus and organ or piano in 1973.

== Text ==
The following table shows the Hebrew text of the Psalm with vowels, alongside the Koine Greek text in the Septuagint and the English translation from the King James Version. Note that the meaning can slightly differ between these versions, as the Septuagint and the Masoretic Text come from different textual traditions.{[efn|1=A 1917 translation directly from Hebrew to English by the Jewish Publication Society can be found here or here, and an 1844 translation directly from the Septuagint by L. C. L. Brenton can be found here. Both translations are in the public domain.}} In the Septuagint, this psalm is numbered Psalm 91.

#	Hebrew	English	Greek
(Note: In the Jewish verse numbering, the ascription of this psalm is verse 1, and the rest of the psalm begins from verse 2. However, the Christian verse numbering does not count the ascription.)	מִזְמ֥וֹר שִׁ֗יר לְי֣וֹם הַשַּׁבָּֽת׃	(A Psalm or Song for the sabbath day.)	Ψαλμὸς ᾠδῆς, εἰς τὴν ἡμέραν τοῦ σαββάτου. -
1	ט֗וֹב לְהֹד֥וֹת לַיהֹוָ֑ה וּלְזַמֵּ֖ר לְשִׁמְךָ֣ עֶלְיֽוֹן׃	It is a good thing to give thanks unto the LORD, and to sing praises unto thy name, O most High:	ΑΓΑΘΟΝ τὸ ἐξομολογεῖσθαι τῷ Κυρίῳ καὶ ψάλλειν τῷ ὀνόματί σου, ῞Υψιστε,
2	לְהַגִּ֣יד בַּבֹּ֣קֶר חַסְדֶּ֑ךָ וֶ֝אֱמ֥וּנָתְךָ֗ בַּלֵּילֽוֹת׃	To shew forth thy lovingkindness in the morning, and thy faithfulness every night,	τοῦ ἀναγγέλλειν τῷ πρωΐ τὸ ἔλεός σου καὶ τὴν ἀλήθειάν σου κατὰ νύκτα
3	עֲֽלֵי־עָ֭שׂוֹר וַעֲלֵי־נָ֑בֶל עֲלֵ֖י הִגָּי֣וֹן בְּכִנּֽוֹר׃	Upon an instrument of ten strings, and upon the psaltery; upon the harp with a solemn sound.	ἐν δεκαχόρδῳ ψαλτηρίῳ μετ᾿ ᾠδῆς ἐν κιθάρᾳ.
4	כִּ֤י שִׂמַּחְתַּ֣נִי יְהֹוָ֣ה בְּפׇעֳלֶ֑ךָ בְּֽמַעֲשֵׂ֖י יָדֶ֣יךָ אֲרַנֵּֽן׃	For thou, LORD, hast made me glad through thy work: I will triumph in the works of thy hands.	ὅτι εὔφρανάς με, Κύριε, ἐν τοῖς ποιήμασί σου, καὶ ἐν τοῖς ἔργοις τῶν χειρῶν σου ἀγαλλιάσομαι.
5	מַה־גָּדְל֣וּ מַעֲשֶׂ֣יךָ יְהֹוָ֑ה מְ֝אֹ֗ד עָמְק֥וּ מַחְשְׁבֹתֶֽיךָ׃	O LORD, how great are thy works! and thy thoughts are very deep.	ὡς ἐμεγαλύνθη τὰ ἔργα σου Κύριε· σφόδρα ἐβαθύνθησαν οἱ διαλογισμοί σου.
6	אִֽישׁ־בַּ֭עַר לֹ֣א יֵדָ֑ע וּ֝כְסִ֗יל לֹא־יָבִ֥ין אֶת־זֹֽאת׃	A brutish man knoweth not; neither doth a fool understand this.	ἀνὴρ ἄφρων οὐ γνώσεται, καὶ ἀσύνετος οὐ συνήσει ταῦτα.
7	בִּפְרֹ֤חַ רְשָׁעִ֨ים ׀ כְּמ֥וֹ־עֵ֗שֶׂב וַ֭יָּצִיצוּ כׇּל־פֹּ֣עֲלֵי אָ֑וֶן לְהִשָּׁמְדָ֥ם עֲדֵי־עַֽד׃	When the wicked spring as the grass, and when all the workers of iniquity do flourish; it is that they shall be destroyed for ever:	ἐν τῷ ἀνατεῖλαι ἁμαρτωλοὺς ὡσεὶ χόρτον καὶ διέκυψαν πάντες οἱ ἐργαζόμενοι τὴν ἀνομίαν, ὅπως ἂν ἐξολοθρευθῶσιν εἰς τὸν αἰῶνα τοῦ αἰῶνος.
8	וְאַתָּ֥ה מָר֗וֹם לְעֹלָ֥ם יְהֹוָֽה׃	But thou, LORD, art most high for evermore.	σὺ δὲ ῞Υψιστος εἰς τὸν αἰῶνα, Κύριε·
9	כִּ֤י הִנֵּ֪ה אֹיְבֶ֡יךָ יְֽהֹוָ֗ה כִּֽי־הִנֵּ֣ה אֹיְבֶ֣יךָ יֹאבֵ֑דוּ יִ֝תְפָּרְד֗וּ כׇּל־פֹּ֥עֲלֵי אָֽוֶן׃	For, lo, thine enemies, O LORD, for, lo, thine enemies shall perish; all the workers of iniquity shall be scattered.	ὅτι ἰδοὺ οἱ ἐχθροί σου, Κύριε, ἰδοὺ οἱ ἐχθροί σου ἀπολοῦνται, καὶ διασκορπισθήσονται πάντες οἱ ἐργαζόμενοι τὴν ἀνομίαν,
10	וַתָּ֣רֶם כִּרְאֵ֣ים קַרְנִ֑י בַּ֝לֹּתִ֗י בְּשֶׁ֣מֶן רַעֲנָֽן׃	But my horn shalt thou exalt like the horn of an unicorn: I shall be anointed with fresh oil.	καὶ ὑψωθήσεται ὡς μονοκέρωτος τὸ κέρας μου καὶ τὸ γῆράς μου ἐν ἐλαίῳ πίονι·
11	וַתַּבֵּ֥ט עֵינִ֗י בְּשׁ֫וּרָ֥י בַּקָּמִ֖ים עָלַ֥י מְרֵעִ֗ים תִּשְׁמַ֥עְנָה אׇזְנָֽי׃	Mine eye also shall see my desire on mine enemies, and mine ears shall hear my desire of the wicked that rise up against me.	καὶ ἐπεῖδεν ὁ ὀφθαλμός μου ἐν τοῖς ἐχθροῖς μου, καὶ ἐν τοῖς ἐπανισταμένοις ἐπ᾿ ἐμὲ πονηρευομένοις ἀκούσατε τὸ οὖς μου.
12	צַ֭דִּיק כַּתָּמָ֣ר יִפְרָ֑ח כְּאֶ֖רֶז בַּלְּבָנ֣וֹן יִשְׂגֶּֽה׃	The righteous shall flourish like the palm tree: he shall grow like a cedar in Lebanon.	δίκαιος ὡς φοῖνιξ ἀνθήσει, ὡσεὶ ἡ κέδρος ἡ ἐν τῷ Λιβάνῳ πληθυνθήσεται.
13	שְׁ֭תוּלִים בְּבֵ֣ית יְהֹוָ֑ה בְּחַצְר֖וֹת אֱלֹהֵ֣ינוּ יַפְרִֽיחוּ׃	Those that be planted in the house of the LORD shall flourish in the courts of our God.	πεφυτευμένοι ἐν τῷ οἴκῳ Κυρίου, ἐν ταῖς αὐλαῖς τοῦ Θεοῦ ἡμῶν ἐξανθήσουσιν·
14	ע֭וֹד יְנוּב֣וּן בְּשֵׂיבָ֑ה דְּשֵׁנִ֖ים וְֽרַעֲנַנִּ֣ים יִהְיֽוּ׃	They shall still bring forth fruit in old age; they shall be fat and flourishing;	ἔτι πληθυνθήσονται ἐν γήρει πίονι καὶ εὐπαθοῦντες ἔσονται τοῦ ἀναγγεῖλαι
15	לְ֭הַגִּיד כִּֽי־יָשָׁ֣ר יְהֹוָ֑ה צ֝וּרִ֗י וְֽלֹא־[עַוְלָ֥תָה] (עלתה) בּֽוֹ׃	To shew that the LORD is upright: he is my rock, and there is no unrighteousness in him.	ὅτι εὐθὴς Κύριος ὁ Θεὸς ἡμῶν καὶ οὐκ ἔστιν ἀδικία ἐν αὐτῷ.

=== Verse 1 ===
It is good to give thanks to the Lord,

And to sing praises to Your name, O Most High;

Franz Delitzsch, who sub-titles this psalm "sabbath thoughts", observes that honouring the Sabbath "is good ... not merely good in the eyes of God, but also good for man, beneficial to the heart, pleasant and blessed".
