= Barukh she'amar =

Jewish morning prayer

Barukh she'amar (Hebrew: בָּרוּךְ שֶׁאָמַר, romanized: bāruḵ šeʾāmar, lit. 'Blessed is He who said' or other variant English spellings), is the opening blessing to pesukei dezimra, a recitation in the morning prayer in Rabbinic Judaism. As with many texts in Judaism, it takes its name from the opening words of the prayer.

According to authorities beginning with Jacob ben Asher, the prayer must be sung to a melody; according to authorities beginning with Or Zarua II, it should be said standing.

According to Or Zarua II, the Barukh she'amar contains 87 words, which number is the gematria of the Hebrew word paz (פ״ז) meaning "refined gold.". An alternative text is printed in some Sephardic prayer books, often alongside the more common version.

== Purpose ==
Barukh she'amar acts as a transition in the prayer service. In the Syrian tradition, the common melody for the prayer is derived from that of Hatikvah.

== Origin ==
According to Jacob ben Asher and Isaac Aboab I, Barukh she-Amar is described by the Sefer Hekhalot. However, no extant manuscript contains this reference. (Note: According to Idelsohn, Barukh she-Amar appears in "Hechaloth Gedoloth F. 22". This is an unfortunate error; he meant Halakhot Gedolot pg. 22 (Berlin 1891).) Moses ben Jacob of Coucy, Amram ben Sheshna, Natronai ben Hilai, and Saadia Gaon attest to its popular use by the 9th century. According to the Mishneh Torah (c. 1175), this prayer was instituted by the Great Assembly; Or Zarua II (Note: There is no reliable information about the author of this book, which is widely attributed to "David b. Judah". This line entered standard rabbinic literature through David HaLevi Segal.) (c. 1300) claims "this is the best of the praises, because the Great Assembly did not establish it but rather was given to the wise tradents by way of a note from heaven."

In the Sephardic and Mizrahi liturgies, as well as Nusach Sefard, the custom is to recite most of the additional psalms of Shabbat (except for Psalms 92 and 93) prior to Barukh she-Amar on Shabbat.

== Aspects of God ==
There are seven aspects of God mentioned in Barukh she'amar. These are:

1. God spoke and the world came to be.
2. God speaks, does, decrees, and fulfills.
3. God is merciful.
4. God rewards those who fear Him.
5. God is eternal.
6. God rescues and redeems people.
7. Blessed is God's name.
