= Baruch HaShem Le'Olam =

Jewish compilation of Tanach verses

Baruch HaShem Le'Olam (Hebrew: ברוך ה׳ לעולם, 'Blessed is HaShem Forever', also sometimes called יראו עינינו, 'yiru eininu', after the blessing included at the end) (Note: Obscuring the 7 Holy Names This article is only a general overview. It may not mention all differences between nusachim or quote all related Halacha. For specifics consult your rabbi or a posek.: / English / Translit. / Hebrew; Why obscure?: To observe prohibition against writing HaShem's names where they may be destroyed (Deuteronomy 12:3–4), incl. in printed electronic media: 4-letter name / HaShem / HaShem / יְיָ / השם; 12-, 42-, 72-letter names / Only 3-letter acronyms in grey with letters replaced by "∞" and warnings; Ado-ai (for 4-letter) / HaShem / HaShem / יְיָ / השם; Ado-ai (itself) / L-rd / Ado-ai / אֲדֹ-י; Kel / G-d / Kel / קֵל; Elokim / G-d / Elokim / אֱלֹקִים; Ekyeh / Ekyeh / Ekyeh / אֶֽקְיֶ֑ה; Shakkai / Alm-ghty / Shakkai / שַׁקַי֙; Tzvakot / H-sts / Tzvakot / צְבָאקֹת; Exceptions: Words only containing part of the 4-letter name, or Kel used in personal names (Joel / Yoel / יואל)) (Note: Different components of a Jewish prayer service This article is only a general overview. It may not mention all differences between nusachim or quote all related Halacha. For specifics consult your rabbi or a posek. Blessing an aspect or action of HaShem: Blessed are you HaShem our G-d, king of the world...; ...בָּרוּךְ אַתָּה השם אֱלֹקֵינוּ מֶֽלֶךְ הָעוֹלָם; Command Blessing before performing a commandment: Blessed are you HaShem our G-d, king of the world, who sanctified us with your commandments and commanded...; ...בָּרוּךְ אַתָּה השם אֱלֹקֵינוּ מֶֽלֶךְ הָעוֹלָם אֲשֶׁר קִדְּ֒שָֽׁנוּ בְּמִצְוֹתָיו וְצִוָּנוּ; Blessing the 4-letter name to close off another component: Blessed is his sanctified Name, whose kingdom lasts forever.; בָּרוּךְ שֵׁם כְּבוֹד מַלְכוּתוֹ לְעוֹלָם וָעֶד; Request related to surrounding blessings: [L-rd of the world] May it be your will HaShem my G-d and G-d of my fathers that...; ...יְהִי רָצוֹן מִלְּפָנֶֽיךָ השם אֱלֹקֵינוּ וֵאלֹקֵי אֲבוֹתֵֽינוּ [רִבּוֹנוֹ שֶׁל עוֹלָם]; Other: Introduction providing more context to blessings; Reading from Torah, Mishna or Talmud); Psalm or Poem related to blessings around it; Kaddish recited at the end of sections of a service) is a compilation of 18 verses from the Tanakh recited by some Jewish communities during the weekday ma'ariv service, between the Shema and the Amidah. Its name is from the first three words of the first verse. The first four verses are recited by all Orthodox Jewish communities during the Pesukei dezimra section of Shacharit.

== History ==
The prayer was compiled during post-talmudic times when Jews faced various threats when saying Maariv in the evening. Commentators describe these threats in overlapping ways:

- Synagogues could not be built in some residential areas.
- Avudraham said that in the Geonic period Jews were afraid to stay out late enough to pray Maariv.
- Jews normally returned from working their fields to the city in the late afternoon.

Whatever particular reasons applied, to avoid being harassed or potentially killed, Jews held services in the city's surrounding fields, where many of them worked. However, in the evenings when Maariv is said, the darkness made the fields and walking home through the city particularly dangerous.

The Amidah is the longest prayer in most services. It is made up of 18 prayers mentioning HaShem's Great Name 18 times. That is why its other interchangeable name is Shmoneh Esrei (literally "the 18"). Since technically Maariv is not obligatory the way the other prayers were, it was considered acceptable to replace the communal Maariv Amidah with something shorter to reduce the time it took to say Maariv. This reduced the time in the fields and the trip home could be made earlier.

The shorter replacement, Baruch HaShem Le'Olam, has 18 verses from the Tanach, mainly Psalms. Theses verses also mention HaShem's Great Name 18 times to further align it with the Amidah. Immediately after it and Kaddish were said, Maariv ended and congregants could leave for home. Some say that the replaced Amidah would then be recited privately in the relative safety of their houses.

Even after the danger passed, many communities maintained Baruch HaShem Le'Olam as part of Maariv in some communities where it is said before the communal Maariv Amidah. This is observed in terms of not abolishing practices sanctified by long-term observance originally instituted by rabbinical decree (Tosefot Berachot 4b).

Some Halakhic commentaries say it should not be included because it causes an interruption between Shema (and its blessings) and Amidah. According to Machzor Vitry the verses were allowed to be added as the third blessing of the weekday Maariv Shema by the "heads [rabbis] of the Academy in Persia (Vitry, p. 78, Pardes ii)". They decided that the Halacha of not adding anything between the blessing the blessing of Shema and the Amidah only applied to Shacharit but not to Maariv.

== Usage ==
Whether Baruch HaShem Le'Olam is recited during the weekday Maariv depends on the nusach (Jewish custom) followed by a minyan as expressed in the siddur used in their prayer services. For the major nusachim:

- Nusach Ashkenaz siddurim include Baruch HaShem Le'Olam. However, most Nusach Ashkenaz communities in Israel follow the practice of the Vilna Gaon and do not recite it.
- The standard Sephardic rite does not include Baruch HaShem Le'Olam. However, it does appear in older Sephardic siddurim such as Venice and Livorno, and it is still recited in an abridged form by some Moroccan communities, most often only at the conclusion of the Sabbath.
- Some versions of Nusach Sefard include the 18 verses. Other versions of Nusach Sefard, including Nusach Chabad, do not include Baruch HaShem Le'Olam.
- It is recited in the Italian Nusach.
- It is recited in Baladi-Yeminite rite, but is recited in as an extension of the previous Hashkiveinu blessing rather than as its own blessing.

Siddurim including and excluding Baruch HaShem Le'Olam, and the Orthodox Jewish communities that use them
Siddur (Nusach)	Used by	Maariv (v.1-18)?	Shacharit (v.1-4)?	Description
Siddur Ashkenaz (Nusach Askenaz)	Ashkenazi	Yes. However, it is omitted in most Ashkenazic communities in Israel in accordance with the practice of the Vilna Gaon.	Yes	Compiled c.1055 – c.1105 CE. Used by Ashkenazi communities in central and western Europe.
Siddur Edot HaMizrach	Sephardic Jews	No. However, it appears in old Sephardic siddurim and it is still recited in an abridged form by some Moroccan communities, most often only at the conclusion of the Sabbath.	Yes	The rite used by Spanish and Middle Eastern Jews. In some communities, adapted to fit Kabbalistic traditions.
Siddur Sefard (Nusach Askenaz, Sefard and Ari)	Nusach Sefard, Chasidic	Yes However, many Chasidic communities, including Chabad and the vast majority of Chasidim in Israel, do not recite it. Furthermore, most communities which do recite it omit it at the conclusion of the Sabbath and on Chol Hamoed.	Yes	Compiled c.1710 – c.1810 CE. Aim's to reconcile Siddur Ashkenaz with Arizal's Kabbalah.
Italian rite	Italian rite	Yes	Yes	The rite of the original Italian community which has been in Italy for over 1,000 years.
Baladi-Yeminite rite	Yemenite rite	Yes	Yes	Yemenite rite.

=== When verses 1-18 are Included in the weekly Maariv ===
Contemporary communities which recite recite the 18 verses between Shema and Amidah do so on weekdays. The verses are not recited on Shabbat or Festivals. Since it was implemented for working people, it is said on weekdays when work is allowed, but not on days on which work is not allowed (Shabbat or Festivals). However, there were communities in the Middle Ages which recited a shortened version of the blessing on the Sabbath, replacing the 18 verses with Ve-shamru (Exodus 31:16-17).

Also, in most Chasidic communities where it is recited, it is omitted during Maariv immediately after Shabbat and Festivals, and on Chol HaMoed (intermediate days during the Pesach and Sukkot Festivals).

=== Verses 1-4 normally included in Shacharit ===
The inclusion of the first 4 verses in the Shacharit service is not related to the reasons for the replacement of the Amidah by the full 18 verses in the weekday Maariv service (peril of life). These 4 verses are a common part of the daily Shacharit service. They are recited every day of the week (including Shabbat) when the daily Hallel in Pesukei Dezimra using Ps 145–150 is recited.

=== Shema al HaMitah ===
Shema al HaMitah (Shema before going to sleep at night), includes the last 4 verses as part of the readings after the bedtime Shema.

== Text of Baruch HaShem Le'Olam ==
#	English translation	Transliteration	Hebrew	Source
The first 4 verses are said by all denominations, during Shacharit at the end of the daily Hallel of Pesukei Dezimra
Nusach Ashkenaz and some Nusach Sefard say all 18 verses in weekday Maariv between Shema and Amidah. To the extent that it is still recited by Sephardim (primarily Moroccans), and in the Italian and Baladi rites, the selection of the verses, as well as the concluding blessing, are somewhat different.
1	Blessed is HaShem forever, Amen and Amen!	Baruch Adonai l'olam amen v'amen.	בָּרוּךְ ה׳ לְעוֹלָם אָמֵן וְאָמֵן	Ps 89:53
2	Blessed is HaShem from Zion Who dwells in Jerusalem, Hallelujah.	Baruch Adonai mitziyon shochein Yerushalayim, hall'luyah.	בָּרוּךְ ה׳ מִצִּיּוֹן שֹׁכֵן יְרוּשָׁלָֽםִ הַלְ֒לוּיָהּ	Ps 135:21
3	Blessed is HaShem our God, God of Israel who alone performs wonders.	Baruch Adonai Elohim, Elohei-Yisra'el osei nifla'ot l'vado	בָּרוּךְ ה׳ אֱלֹהִים אֱלֹהֵי יִשְׂרָאֵל עֹשֵׂה נִפְלָאוֹת לְבַדּוֹ	Ps 72:18
4	Blessed is the Name of His glory forever and may His glory fill the whole earth; Amen and Amen!	Uvaruch shem k'vodo l'olam v'yimale ch'vodo et-kol-ha'aretz amen v'amen	וּבָרוּךְ שֵׁם כְּבוֹדוֹ לְעוֹלָם וְיִמָּלֵא כְבוֹדוֹ אֶת־כָּל־הָאָֽרֶץ אָמֵן וְאָמֵן	Ps 72:19
5	The Glory of HaShem will endure forever; HaShem will rejoice in His works.	Y'hi ch'vod Adonai l'olam yismaḥ Adonai b'ma'asav	יְהִי כְבוֹד ה׳ לְעוֹלָם יִשְׂמַח ה׳ בְּמַעֲשָׂיו	Ps 104:31
6	The Name of HaShem will be blessed from now forever.	Y'hi shem-Adonai m'vorach mei'ata v'ad-olam	יְהִי שֵׁם ה׳ מְבֹרָךְ מֵעַתָּה וְעַד־עוֹלָם	Ps 113:2
7	For HaShem will not cast off His people, for the sake of His great Name, because HaShem has determined to make you His people.	Ki lo yitosh Adonai et-ammo ba'avur sh'mo hagadol ki ho'il Adonai la'asot etchem lo l'am	כִּי לֹא יִטּשׁ ה׳ אֶת־עַמּוֹ בַּעֲבוּר שְׁמוֹ הַגָּדוֹל כִּי הוֹאִיל ה׳ לַעֲשׂוֹת אֶתְכֶם לוֹ לְעָם	1Sam 12:22
8	And all the people saw it and they fell on their faces, and proclaimed, "HaShem, He is God! HaShem, He is God!"	Va'yar kol-ha'am va'yip'lu al peneihem vayomru Adonai hu ha'Elohim Adonai hu ha'Elohim	וַיַּרְא כָּל־הָעָם וַיִּפְּ֒לוּ עַל פְּנֵיהֶם וַיֹּאמְ֒רוּ השם הוּא הָאֱלִֹהִים ה׳ הוּא הָאֱלִֹהִים	1Kgs 18:39
9	And HaShem will be King over the whole earth; on that day HaShem will be One and His Name One.	V'haya Adonai l'melech al kol-ha'aretz bayom hahu yihyeh Adonai eḥad ush'mo eḥad	וְהָיָה ה׳ לְמֶֽלֶךְ עַל כָּל־הָאָֽרֶץ בַּיּוֹם הַהוּא ה׳ אֶחָד וּשְׁמוֹ אֶחָד	Zech 14:9
10	HaShem, may Your kindness be upon us as we have hoped for You.	Y'hi-ḥasdecha Adonai aleinu ka'asher yiḥalnu lach	יְהִי־חַסְדְּ֒ךָ ה׳ עָלֵֽינוּ כַּאֲשֶׁר יִחַֽלְנוּ לָךְ	Ps 33:22
11	Deliver us, HaShem, our God, gather us from the nations to give thanks to Your Holy Name, to be extolled in Your praise.	Hoshi'enu Adonai Eloheinu vekab'tzenu min-hagoyim l'hodot l'shem kodshecha l'hishtabeaḥ bit'hilatecha	הוֹשִׁיעֵֽנוּ ה׳ אֱלֹהֵינוּ וְקַבְּ֒צֵֽנוּ מִן־הַגּוֹיִם לְהוֹדוֹת לְשֵׁם קׇדְשֶֽׁךָ לְהִשְׁתַּבֵּֽחִַ בִּתְהִלָּתֶֽךָ	Ps 106:47
12	All the nations which You have made will come and bow down before You, my Lord, and they will give honor to Your Name.	Kol-goyim asher asita yavo'u veyishtaḥavu lefanecha Adonai vichab'du lishmecha	כָּל־גּוֹיִם אֲשֶׁר עָשִֽׂיתָ יָבֹֽאוּ וְיִשְׁתַּחֲווּ לְפָנֶֽיךָ אֲדֹנָי וִיכַבְּ֒דוּ לִשְׁמֶֽךָ	Ps 86:9
13	For You are great and do wondrous things, You alone are God.	Ki-gadol ata v'osei nifla'ot ata Elohim l'vadecha	כִּי־גָדוֹל אַתָּה וְעֹשֵׂה נִפְלָאוֹת אַתָּה אֱלֹהִים לְבַדֶּֽךָ	Ps 86:10
14	And we, Your people, the sheep of Your pasture, will give thanks to You forever, from generation to generation we will recount Your praise.	Va'anachnu amecha v'tzon mar'itecha node l'cha le'olam l'dor vador n'sapper t'hilatecha	וַאֲנַֽחְנוּ עַמְּ֒ךָ וְצֹאן מַרְעִיתֶֽךָ נוֹדֶה לְּךָ לְעוֹלָם לְדוֹר וָדוֹר נְסַפֵּר תְּהִלָּתֶֽךָ	Ps 79:13
The concluding readings to Shema al HaMitah include the last 4 verses.
15	Blessed is HaShem by day, Blessed is HaShem by night, Blessed is HaShem when we lie down, Blessed is HaShem when we rise.	Baruch Adonai bayyom baruch Adonai balayla baruch Adonai b'shochveinu baruch Adonai b'kumenu	בָּרוּךְ ה׳ בַּיּוֹם בָּרוּךְ ה׳ בַּלָּֽיְלָה בָּרוּךְ ה׳ בְּשָׁכְבֵֽנוּ בָּרוּךְ ה׳ בְּקוּמֵֽנוּ	Ps 92:3 (Note: Inspired by.)
16	For in Your hand are the souls of the living and the dead: for in His hand is the soul of every living thing, and the spirit of every human being.	Ki v'yadecha nafshot haḥayim v'hametim asher beyado nefesh kol-ḥai veruaḥ kol-b'sar-ish	כִּי בְיָדְ֒ךָ נַפְשׁוֹת הַחַיִּים וְהַמֵּתִים אֲשֶׁר בְּיָדוֹ נֶֽפֶשׁ כָּל־חַי וְרֽוּחַ כָּל־בְּשַׂר־אִישׁ	Job 12:10
17	In Your hand, I commit my spirit; You have liberated me HaShem, God of truth.	B'yadecha afkid ruchi paditah oti Adonai El emet	בְּיָדְ֒ךָ אַפְקִיד רוּחִי פָּדִֽיתָה אוֹתִי ה׳ אֵל אֱמֶת	Ps 31:6
18	Our God in heaven, reveal the unity of Your Name, preserve Your kingdom always and reign over us forever and ever.	Eloheinu shebashamayim yached shimcha v'kayeim malchutecha tamid umloch aleinu le'olam va'ed	אֱלֹהֵינוּ שֶׁבַּשָּׁמַֽיִם יַחֵד שִׁמְךָ וְקַיֵּם מַלְכוּתְ֒ךָ תָּמִיד וּמְלֹךְ עָלֵֽינוּ לְעוֹלָם וָעֶד	Is 52:7
Preface to the Blessing	May our eyes behold, our hearts rejoice, and our souls be glad in thy true salvation, when it shall be said unto Zion, Thy God reigneth. The Lord reigneth; the Lord hath reigned; the Lord shall reign for ever and ever: for the kingdom is thine, and to everlasting thou wilt reign in glory; for we have no king but thee.		.יִרְאוּ עֵינֵינוּ וְיִשְׂמַח לִבֵּנוּ וְתָגֵל נַפְשֵׁנוּ בִּישׁוּעָתְךָ בְּאֱמֶת בֶּאֱמוֹר לְצִיוֹן מָלַךְ אֱלֹהָיִךְ. ה' מֶלֶךְ, ה' מָלַךְ, ה' יִמְלוֹךְ לְעוֹלָם וָעֶד. כִּי הַמַּלְכוּת שֶׁלְּךָ הִיא וּלְעוֹלְמֵי עַד תִּמְלוֹךְ בְּכָבוֹד. כִּי אֵין לָנוּ מֶלֶךְ אֶלָּא אַתָּה	
Blessing	Blessed art thou, O Lord, the King, who constantly in his glory will reign over us and over all his works for ever and ever.		בָּרוּךְ אַתָּה ה' הַמֶּלֶךְ בִּכְבוֹדוֹ תָּמִיד יִמְלוֹךְ עָלֵינוּ לְעוֹלָם וָעֶד וְעַל כָּל מַעֲשָׂיו.	

== Commentary ==
The 18 verses mention the glory, love and justice of God, pray for redemption, security, peace, and recognition by the whole world of God's oneness. The verses have common themes especially universalism and redemption.

Eitz Yosef notes that each of the first 4 verses begin with the word "Baruch" (בָּרוּךְ), Hebrew for "blessed". This is not intended to be understood as the reader blessing HaShem, but rather referring to HaShem as the source of all blessing. These verses are a sort of blessing marking the end of the preceding 6 Psalms in the Hallel of Pesukei Dezimra (Ps 145–150), which are considered the essence of Pesukei Dezimra. These Psalms enumerate many of the blessings referred to in the 4 verses.

The four verses are recited following the daily Hallel in the Shacharit Pesukei Dezimra to relate Hallel to blessing.

Unusually, the word Amen is recited twice at the end of the first and third verses as an extra emphasis of the truth of the statements.
