= Takkanah =

Novel edict in Jewish religious law

A takkanah (Hebrew: תקנה, romanized: taqqānā, pl. takkanot, 'improvement') is a major legislative enactment within halakha, the normative system of Judaism's laws. A takkanah is an enactment that revises an ordinance that no longer satisfies the requirements of the times or circumstances or which, being deduced from a biblical passage, may be regarded as new. A takkanah is enacted by a rabbinical decree or ordinance to improve and preserve religious life. It is, therefore, the antithesis of the gezerah (Hebrew: גְּזֵרָה, romanized: gǝzērā). The term is applied also to the institution provided for in the enactment.

Takkanot were enacted even in the time of the Second Temple, those of unknown origin being ascribed to earlier leaders, and they have been promulgated at all subsequent periods of Jewish history.

== Introduction ==
Classical Jewish law granted the Chazal, the first rabbinical authorities, wide legislative powers. There are two powerful legal tools within the Halakhic system:

- Gezera: "preventive legislation" of the Chazal, intended to prevent violations of the commandments
- Taqqana: "positive legislation", practice instituted by the rabbis not based (directly) on the commandments as such (e.g. rabbinical mitzvot).

However, taqqanah can refer to either gezerot or taqqanot in later literature.

Taqqanot, in general, do not affect or restrict observance of mitzvot. However, the Talmud states that in exceptional cases, the Jewish sages had the authority to make a gezera even if it would "uproot a matter from the Torah". In Talmudic and classical Rabbinic literature, this authority refers to the power to prohibit specific actions that would otherwise be permitted by Jewish law, known as halakha. Rabbis may rule that a Torah-based mitzva should not be performed—e.g. blowing the shofar on Shabbat or blessing the four species of Sukkot on Shabbat. These gezerot are executed out of fear that some might otherwise carry the mentioned items between home and the synagogue, thus inadvertently violating one of the 39 Melakhot, a greater sin than neglecting a mitzva.

Another rare and limited form of taqqana involved overriding Torah prohibitions. In some cases, the sages permitted temporary exceptions to a prohibition to maintain the system as a whole. This was part of the basis for Esther's relationship with Ahasuerus.

== Biblical taqqanot ==
Ascribed to Moses:

1. the observance on holy days of the ceremonies peculiar to the festivals in question
2. public Torah reading on the Sabbath, holy days, Rosh Hodesh, and Chol HaMoed
3. the first blessing in Birkat Hamazon
4. the eight Priestly watches managed by the Priestly divisions, four by Eleazar and four by Ithamar, which Samuel and David increased to twenty-four
5. the seven days of wedding festivities for a virgin (the festivities for a widow's wedding were later ordained to last three days), and seven days of mourning for the dead

To Joshua:

1. the second blessing in Birkat Hamazon
2. ten regulations which, however, are not takkanot in the strict sense of the term

To Boaz, the ancestor of David:

1. salutation in the name of God

To King David:

1. increase of the eight watches of the priests to twenty-four (see above);
2. the recitation of 100 blessings daily
3. the third blessing in Birkat Hamazon

To King Solomon:

1. the practise regarding the Eruv
2. the washing of the hands before Kiddush, which Shammai and Hillel made obligatory for Terumah as well, while later authorities extended it to still other occasions
3. the regulation regarding entrance upon another's fields after the harvest (possibly enacted by Joshua also)

To the early prophets:

1. The singing of Hallel on every important occasion, and especially after escape from danger
2. the introduction of twenty-four divisions of laymen, corresponding to the twenty-four watches of the priests

To the Prophets before the destruction of Solomon's Temple:

1. payment of terumah and tithes in Babylon as well as in the Land of Israel
2. payment of the second tithe ("ma'aser sheni") in the seventh year
3. payment of it in Egypt, Ammon, and Moab likewise
4. payment of the poor tithe ("ma'aser 'ani") even in the seventh year

To the Prophets after the destruction of the Temple:

1. fasting on the Seventh of Tammuz, Tisha B'Av, First of Tishri, and Tenth of Tevet

To Ezra:

1. the reading of ten verses of the Torah by three men on Monday and Thursday (Bava Kamma 82a)
2. the reading of Leviticus 26:14-46 before Shavuot, and of Deuteronomy 28:15-69 before Rosh Hashanah
3. sessions of the courts on Monday and Thursday
4. the washing of clothes on Thursday
5. the eating of garlic on Friday
6. early rising on Friday morning for the purpose of baking
7. the wearing of a girdle by women for reasons of modesty
8. the obligation of the mikvah
9. the law obliging peddlers to traverse the city in case they deal in articles necessary for women
10. ritual baths for those who have become unclean (Keri)

== Second Temple period (excluding biblical figures) ==
To the men of the Great Assembly in the early Second Temple period

1. introduction of blessings, prayer, Kiddush, and Havdalah
2. the recitation of the Amida on weekdays
3. the reading of the Book of Esther ("the Megillah") in the villages and unwalled cities on 14 Adar and in cities with defensive walls on the following day; banquets on those days; and the giving of alms
4. the introduction of seven blessings into the Amidah on Shabbat and holidays; the addition of nine benedictions to the mussaf prayer for Rosh Hodesh and Chol HaMoed, and of twenty-four on fast-days
5. Recitation of prayers:
  1. recitation of several prayers
  2. period of duration of each prayer
  3. the offering of prayer daily
  4. three times on weekdays,
  5. four times on Shabbat, Jewish holidays, fasts, and Rosh Hodesh
  6. five times on Yom Kippur, the Day of Atonement
6. addition of the "Magen Avot" to the Amidah at Shabbat ma’ariv
7. bowing before and after the first blessing ("Avot") and before and after the penultimate blessing of the Amidah ("hoda'ah")

Ascribed to John Hyrcanus (135-106 BC):

1. Decree forbidding the recitation of the prayer of thanksgiving, Viddui Ma'aser (Deut. 26:5–10) by any who have not paid the proper tithes at the end of the third year
2. the appointment of officials to collect the tithes
3. the use of rings in the shambles to force the animals to stand still
4. prohibition of blacksmithing on Chol HaMoed

By the court of the Hasmoneans:

1. Celebration of Hanukkah beginning on the 25th of Kislev
2. Insertion of the name of God in legal documents (subsequently abrogated)

By the priestly court:

- the daughter of a priest to be entitled to 300 zuzim under her marriage contract, and the widow of a priest to 100 zuzim
- the ketubah of a woman about to contract a levirate marriage to form a lien on the property of her first husband; and if he had no property, that of the levir to be appropriated
- the ketubah of a virgin to be of the value of 200 zuzim, and that of a widow or divorcée, 100 zuzim

By Shimon ben Shetach:

1. all the real estate of the husband to be entered in the marriage contract in favor of the wife, but the former may employ the dowry in his business;
2. compulsory attendance at school
3. the declaration that foreign glass is impure

By Hillel the Elder (75 BC - 5 AD):

1. Introduction of the prozbul
2. the purchase-money of a house to be deposited in the Second Temple; the original owner may seize it by force to prevent its payment to the seller before the expiration of a year

By Gamaliel (mid-1st century):

1. The condemnation of 2000 (subsequently increased) cubits of ground in which Rosh Hodesh witnesses might freely move on the Sabbath
2. the full names of the husband and the wife to be inserted in a get
3. the signatures of witnesses to the bill of divorce
4. a widow may take the portion secured to her by her marriage contract only after all claims of the orphans have been fully satisfied
5. a bill of divorce may be declared invalid only in the presence of the messenger who has brought it, or in the presence of the wife before she has received it

== Tannaitic period ==
Most of the ordinances of Yohanan ben Zakkai were promulgated before the time of the destruction of the Temple in Jerusalem. These include:

1. the New Moon witnesses must go to the place where the court assembles
2. the testimony of such witnesses to be received at any time during the day
3. they may not desecrate the Sabbath by traveling, except in Nisan and Tishri, the most important two months
4. the shofar to be blown even on the Sabbath
5. the lulav to be swung on all the seven days of the festival
6. the consumption of new grain is forbidden during the entire day of the waving of the Omer
7. priests may not wear sandals when they ascend the "dukan," or platform, to pronounce the blessing
8. a convert must deposit a quarter-shekel in the treasury to be able to bring his sacrifice when the Temple shall be rebuilt (this was repealed by Johanan b. Zakkai himself)
9. abolition of the ritual governing trials for adultery

Ascribed to Gamaliel II and the court of Yavne:

1. Agriculture is permitted until the first day of the Sabbatical year

Ascribed to the court of Yavne:

1. the fourth blessing of Birkat Hamazon, in memory of those who fell at Betar
2. the insertion of the prayer against heretics in the time of Gamaliel, and, much later, of the "Adonai Sefatai" before the "Tefillah."

After R. Gamaliel's death the Sanhedrin of Yavne seems to have gone to Usha for reasons which are no longer known, and the grounds of its takkanot are equally obscure. In view of their ethical import, however, these enactments soon became binding. They were as follows:

1. a man must support his minor children
2. if a man transfers his property to his sons, both he and his wife enjoy a life income from it
3. the gift of more than one-fifth of one's property for alms is forbidden
4. a father must deal gently with his son until the latter reaches the age of twelve; but after that age he may be severe with him
5. after a wife's death the husband may sell the property included in her dowry
6. one who attacks an old man must pay one pound of gold for the injury
7. elucidation of the seven doubtful reasons through which the terumah becomes unfit for use and must be burned

These ordinances were enacted by the rabbis of the second generation of tannaim, Rabbi Ishmael being especially mentioned.

An ordinance is also extant which dates from the time called the period of religious persecution ("shemad"). When Hadrian issued his decree forbidding the Jews to observe their religion, the teachers, including R. Akiba, R. Tarfon, and R. Jose the Galilean, met in council and agreed that during the time of the persecution the Law might be transgressed in all respects, except as regarded the commands relating to idolatry, chastity, and morality, although this regulation was observed only superficially and only when necessary in order to deceive the Roman spies.

Three ordinances have been preserved which were promulgated by R. Jose ben Halafta (third generation of tannaim):

1. during a funeral the mourners must remain standing while those who console them pass by
2. women living in lonely places must associate with one another, so as not to attract the attention and evil desire of any man
3. a child accompanied by its mother must not lag behind on the road, lest it come to harm

To R. Judah HaNasi:

1. messengers must be sent every month to announce the new moon to the Diaspora
2. concerning the purchase of fields among the Sicarii
3. on menstruation

== By topic ==
=== Regarding women ===
Ordinances from the period of the Mishnah and relating to women are as follows:

1. an orphan girl married during her minority may leave her husband without a bill of divorce on attaining her majority
2. the permission to marry a feebleminded girl
3. a virgin should be married on a Wednesday
4. various laws of purification
5. the earnings of the wife belong to her husband
6. the husband must pay all bills for his wife's illness
7. a husband must ransom his wife from captivity
8. a husband must defray the expenses of his wife's burial
9. whatever is found by the wife belongs to her husband
10. a widow is entitled to remain in the house of her deceased husband and to share in the income
11. orphan girls share the income from their father's estate until they reach their majority
12. male heirs succeed to the property of the mother, even after their father's death
13. the daughter is entitled to a certain portion of her father's estate as her dowry
14. a bill of divorce must be written and signed in the presence of the messenger who is to deliver it
15. the date must be given in all legal documents
16. in a bill of divorce the date must be given according to the state calendar; later it was also dated according to the era of Creation
17. witnesses must sign a bill of divorce in the presence of each other
18. introduction of the "geṭ mekushshar" to make divorce more difficult
19. a woman becomes free even though only a single witness testifies to her husband's death

=== For the "preservation of the order of the world" ===
The more the Jews came in contact with the Romans and the Persians, the more they were obliged to mitigate the black letter law, and to introduce ordinances of the class characterized as necessary "for the preservation of the order of the world," or "for the sake of peace." The regulations of this type, like those already mentioned, date from the mishnaic period, and were promulgated for the sake of morality.

1. A servant who is half free may compel his master to manumit him entirely; but he must give a note for one-half his value; and this debt must be paid
2. the ransom paid for prisoners must not exceed the usual sum
3. prisoners must not be allowed to escape
4. Tefillin and other sacred articles must not be taken from Gentiles for excessive price
5. if land in Israel is sold to a Gentile, the first-fruits must be forfeited
6. if one divorces his wife for immorality, he may never take her back again (ib. 45a);
7. on demand, one who has suffered injury is to receive reimbursement from the best of the estate; a creditor, from the medium; and a wife, with her marriage contract as security, from the worst
8. if there is any property without encumbrance, nothing may be taken in payment of a debt from a field which has been mortgaged
9. the least desirable portion of the real estate of orphans may be taken in payment of debts
10. mortgaged property may not be applied to the pleasure or support of the wife
11. one who finds anything shall not take an oath
12. a guardian may not be compelled to take an oath
13. accidental defilement of holy vessels either by a layman or by the priest in the Temple is punishable

=== For "the sake of peace" ===
1. The call to the reading of the Torah to be made in a definite order
2. the eruv (joint legal domain to insure free movement on Shabbat) may be arranged even with unoccupied houses
3. the cistern nearest the river is to be filled first
4. Taking an animal caught in another person's trap (while hunting) is considered theft
5. things found in the possession of one to whom they would not normally come imply theft
6. the poor are permitted to pluck fruit from a neighbor's tree, but taking what remains on the ground is theft
7. even the Gentile may share in the harvest gifts to the poor

=== Facilitating repentance ===
1. One who steals a beam and builds it into his house need pay for the damage to the beam only
2. if a robber or a usurer wishes to restore goods or money taken, they or it shall not be accepted
3. purchase and sale by persons not regularly dealing in the wares in question are valid, in case such persons have reached years of maturity, in order that they may support themselves
4. if one brings a stolen animal as a sin-offering before the theft is known, the sacrifice is valid

=== Business takkanot ===
Ordinances relating to legal proceedings were highly important so long as the Jews retained their own judicial system in the Diaspora. They are a form of business ethics. These include:

==== Ordinances relating to commerce ====
1. It is permissible to take possession of real estate under certain conditions
2. movables may be acquired only by actual possession, not by purchase
3. movables when together with immovables are acquired by purchase or contract
4. acquisition by a verbal conveyance of the three parties concerned is legal; this is not, however, explicitly declared to be an ordinance
5. a verbal conveyance of property by one who is moribund is legally binding
6. a convert may be the heir of a Gentile father
7. even before taking possession a son may dispose of a part of his deceased father's property to defray the funeral expenses
8. if one unwittingly purchases stolen goods, the owner must refund the money paid for them

==== Ordinances relating to civil law ====
1. In actions for debt testimony may be accepted without further investigations
2. actions for debt may be tried even by judges who have not yet received semicha (Sanhedrin)
3. a contract may be authenticated only by the witnesses who have signed it
4. on the strength of his contract a creditor may collect his debts either from the heirs or from those who purchase from the debtor

==== Ordinances on the oath ====
1. If a laborer demands his wages and his employer asserts that he has paid them, the former must take an oath before he can obtain payment
2. one who has been robbed must take an oath before he can recover his property
3. one who asserts that he has been injured by another person must take an oath before he can recover damages
4. if a manager asserts that he has paid an employee, and the latter denies it, both parties take the oath, and the employer pays them both
5. if a contract is falsified by the wife or by the creditor, they must each take an oath before they can receive payment
6. if an employer has only one witness to testify to the payment of a contract, the claimants must take an oath before they can receive their money
7. money due from the property of orphans may be paid only under oath
8. the payment of debts from mortgaged property may be made only under oath
9. payment in the absence of the debtor may be made only under oath
10. liquidation of a debt by means of property dedicated to the sanctuary may be made only under oath
11. expenses incurred in behalf of the wife's property may be recovered only under oath
12. if two parties each claim to have received the same piece of property at the same time, they must take oath to that effect
13. if one asserts that a piece of property entrusted to him has been stolen from him, he must take an oath to that effect
14. one who has unwittingly purchased stolen property must take an oath before he can recover his money
15. if one has unintentionally damaged the property of another, he must take an oath to that effect before he can be released from the payment of damages

=== Relating to Passover ===
1. chametz must be searched for with a light on the eve of the 13th of Nisan
2. on Passover eve bitter herbs, mixed with haroset, must be eaten
3. four cups of wine must be drunk
4. those who partake must recline while eating, in token of freedom

=== Miscellaneous ordinances ===
1. if a Sabbath follows a holiday, an eruv tavshilin is made in order that food for the Sabbath may be prepared on the holiday
2. On the Sabbath and on holidays one may move freely within a radius of 2,000 cubits (see techum shabbat)
3. the owner of lost property must bring witnesses to testify that he is not dishonest, and he must then describe his property before he is entitled to recover it
4. lost articles to be announced in the synagogue

== Post-Mishnaic ordinances ==
The making of new ordinances did not end with the completion of the Mishnah: enactments were promulgated also in the Amoraic, Saboraic, and Geonic periods of Jewish law, although their exact dates are no longer known. These include:

1. The dowry of a wife and the movables of orphans may be taken in payment of debt
2. Movables may be attached for the dowry of orphan girls
3. An oath is valid in cases involving real estate (Halakot Gedolot, xxii).
4. No oath may be taken on the Bible
5. Criminal cases may be tried in Babylon
6. The property of orphans may be taken for the marriage portion of the wife
7. The debtor must take an oath if he is unable to pay
8. The debtor must take an oath if he has obliged the creditor to do so
9. A widow is obliged to take an oath only in case the property bequeathed to her by her husband is insufficient to discharge her marriage contract
10. In legal trials, both the principals and the witnesses must remain seated
11. Wine made by Muslims is not "issur"
12. The priest to be the first one called up to the Torah reading, preceding even the nasi
13. Permission to trade with Gentiles on their holidays
14. The Fast of Esther
15. An apostate may draw up a bill of divorce
16. If a Samaritan betroths a female Jew, she must have a bill of divorce before any one else can marry her
17. Exodus 32:11–14 must be read on fast-days
18. The interruption of the first and last three blessings of the Amidah by supplications
19. The recitation of the morning blessings in the synagogue
20. The recitation of the blessing Ahava rabbah in the morning and of Ahavat Olam in the evening
21. The recitation of Baruch Adonai L'Olam in Maariv before the Amidah
22. The insertion of 1 Chronicles 29:10–13 in the morning prayer
23. The recitation of the "Shema" in the Kedushah prayer
24. Introduction of the prayer beginning with the words כתר יתנו לך in "Kedushah" of musaf, and the prayers beginning with the words אז בקול רעש and ממקומך מלכנו in "Kedushah" of Shacharit of Sabbath
25. The recitation of Psalms 119:142 at the Mincha prayer on the Sabbath, in memory of the death of Moses
26. The blessing for the bridal night
27. "Parashat ha-Musafim"

== In modern times ==
The Conservative Movement also allows its leaders to issue takkanot today. Examples of takkanot issued by the Conservative Movement in modern times include allowing women to count in a minyan and to serve as witnesses to a beth din, as well as removing restrictions on kohen marriage. The Chief Rabbinate of Israel also adopted many such ordinances, though more moderate in character, among them various statutes regarding marriage and divorce.

The rabbis of Morocco held several conferences in the 1940s that issued statutes on various affairs.

== See also ==
- 613 commandments
- Conservative Halakha
- Mitzvah#Rabbinical mitzvot
- Rabbinic literature
- Responsa
- Shulkhan Arukh
- Torah
