= Pidyon haben =

Jewish firstborn son redeemed from a kohen

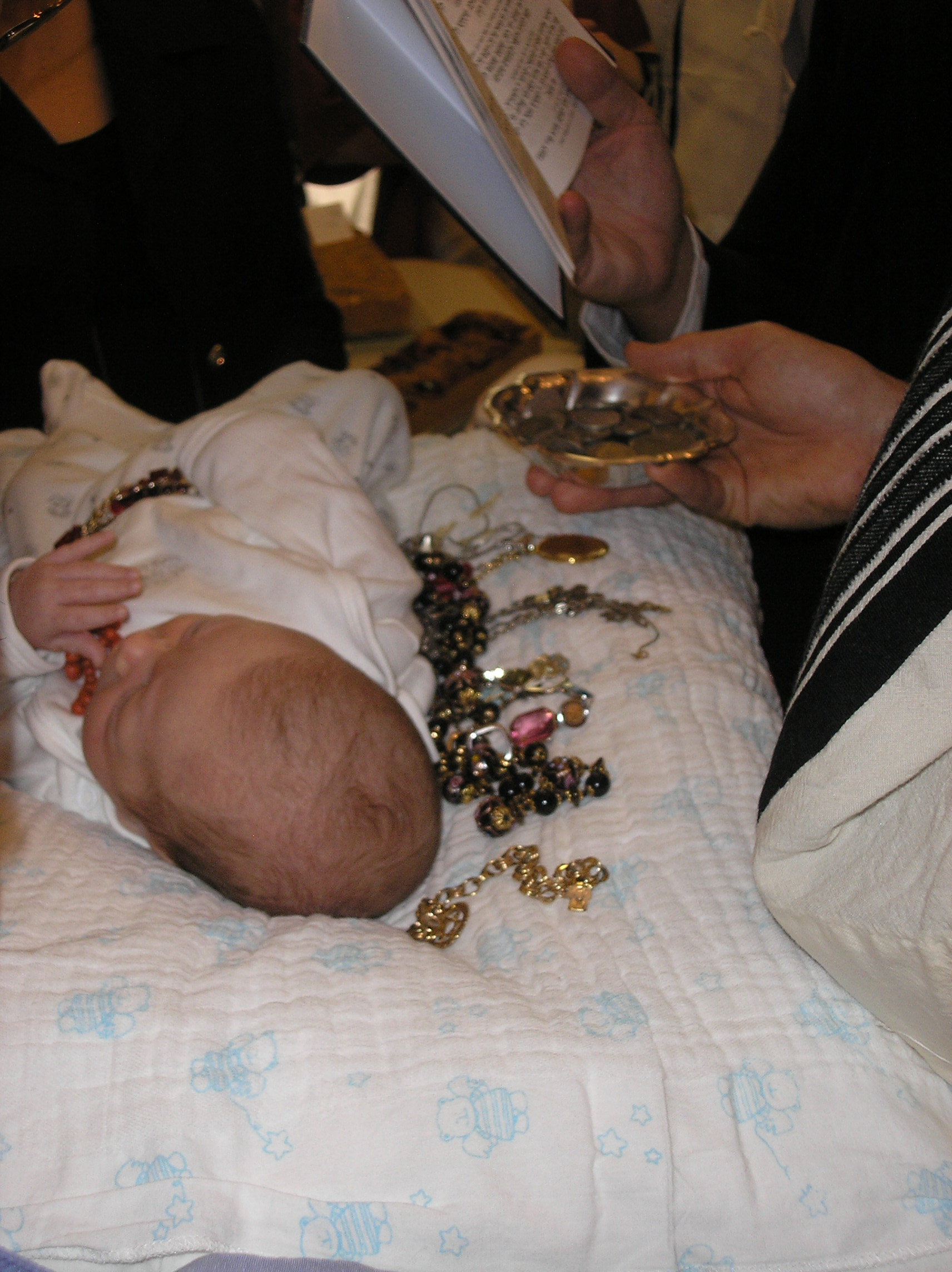

Halakhic texts relating to this article
- Torah: Exodus 13:12–15; Exodus 22:29; Exodus 34:20; Numbers 3:45; Numbers 8:17; Numbers 18:16; Leviticus 12:2–4
- Shulchan Aruch: Yoreh De'ah 305

The pidyon haben (Hebrew: פדיון הבן), or redemption of the first-born son, is a mitzvah in Judaism whereby a Jewish firstborn son is "redeemed" with money.

"Redemption" is achieved by paying five silver coins to a Kohen, a descendant of the priestly family of Aaron, on behalf of the firstborn son. Alternatively, an object of equal value can be used. Pidyon haben is a relatively uncommon ceremony. Families do not perform it if the firstborn is a girl, born by caesarian section, preceded by a miscarriage (though some early miscarriages are not considered miscarriages), or if either grandfather is a Kohen or a Levite.

== Origin ==
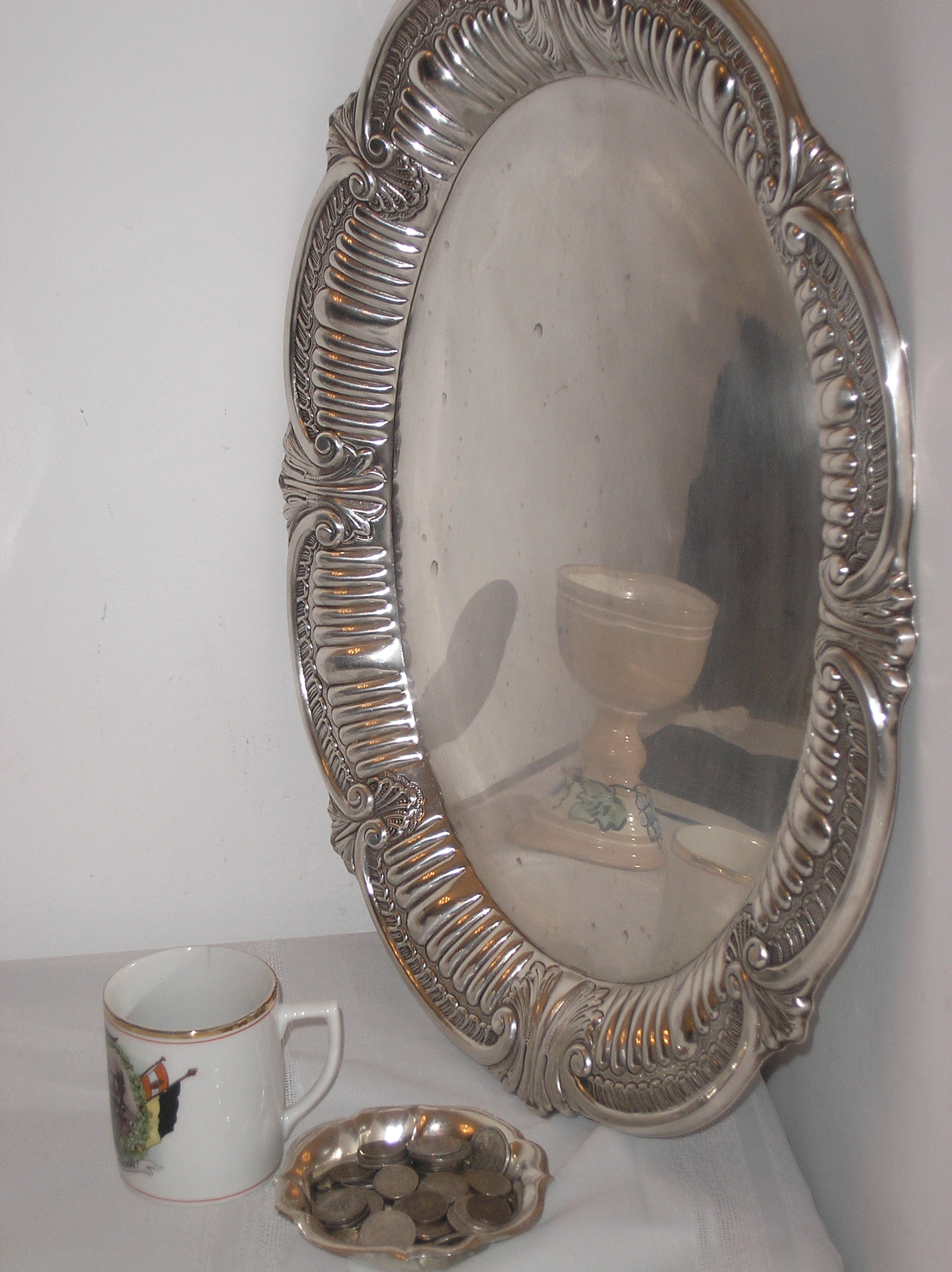
The silver tray, the silver coins and the glass for the wine

In the Hebrew Bible the laws (see mitzvah) concerning the redemption of the first-born male are referred to in Exodus, Numbers and Leviticus:

You shall set apart for יהוה every first issue of the womb: every male firstling that your cattle drop shall be יהוה’s.

But every firstling ass you shall redeem with a sheep; if you do not redeem it, you must break its neck. And you must redeem every male first-born among your children. And when, in time to come, a child of yours asks you, saying, "What does this mean?" you shall reply, "It was with a mighty hand that יהוה brought us out from Egypt, the house of bondage. When Pharaoh stubbornly refused to let us go, יהוה slew every [male] first-born in the land of Egypt, the firstborn of both human and beast. Therefore I sacrifice to יהוה every first male issue of the womb, but redeem every male first-born among my children."

— Exodus 13:12–15

The redemption price for firstborn non-Levites was set at 5 shekels:

The first [male] issue of the womb of every being, human or beast, that is offered to יהוה, shall be yours; but you shall have the male first-born of human beings redeemed, and you shall also have the firstling of impure animals redeemed. Take as their redemption price, from the age of one month up, the money equivalent of five shekels by the sanctuary weight, which is twenty gerahs.

— Numbers 18:15–16

The arakhin laws set the redemption price of different classes of people whose "value" was consecrated; the price for a male child under five years is similarly five shekels.

The Torah describes the tribe of Levi (to which the priests belong) as having inherited the role of divine service which previously belonged to the firstborns:

I hereby take the Levites from among the Israelites in place of all the male first-born, the first issue of the womb among the Israelites: the Levites shall be Mine. For every male first-born is Mine: at the time that I smote every [male] first-born in the land of Egypt, I consecrated every male first-born in Israel, human and beast, to Myself, to be Mine, יהוה’s.

According to the traditional rabbinic interpretation, even before the Exodus the priestly duties were reserved for the oldest son in each family.

The priesthood was given specifically to the kohanim (Aaron and his descendants), and at the same time, it was instituted that the firstborn should be redeemed. The replacement of firstborns with Levites occurred following the golden calf episode; during that episode the Levites remained loyal to God.

== Laws ==
The Shulchan Aruch states that when a Jewish woman gives birth to a firstborn male by natural means (i.e. a boy born vaginally and not by Caesarean section) then the child must be "redeemed". The father of the child must "redeem" the child from a known kohen representing the original Temple priesthood, for the sum of five silver shekels, or equivalent in another nation's currency (if it has silver currency of the correct weight).

This redemption ceremony is performed when at least thirty days have passed since the child's birth. If the 31st day falls on Shabbat or a festival, the redemption is delayed, because any sort of business transaction is not allowed on those days. The elapsed days are counted from sunset to sunset, and the day of birth counts as the first day. While the redemption could be performed immediately after dark on the 31st night, it is usually done the next day; but if the 31st day is a fast day, it is done the previous night, so that it can be accompanied by a festive meal. It is also possible to hold the ceremony on the 30th day itself, if it will be impossible to perform it the next day, so long as at least one synodic month has passed since the moment of birth.

If a first-born son reaches bar mitzvah age without having been redeemed, he is responsible for arranging the mitzvah himself as soon as possible.

=== Exemptions ===
Redemption is required for "the first to exit the womb" (Exodus 13:2) so it is not performed if a daughter is born first. If a woman gives birth to a second son vaginally when the first son was born by caesarean section, that child is not redeemed either. Also, a first-born male does not require redemption if his birth was preceded by an earlier miscarriage by the mother that occurred after the third month of pregnancy. However, if the miscarriage occurred during the first 40 days of pregnancy, redemption is required. If the previous miscarriage occurred after forty days, but before the fetus developed distinguishing characteristics, redemption of the first-born is still required, but the blessing said by the father is omitted.

The procedure does not apply when the father is a kohen or Levite, and does not normally apply when the mother is the daughter of one. The reason is that the Levites, as substitutes for the first-born, are pledged to minister and assist the kohanim in divine service, and cannot be redeemed from this service obligation.

The first-born son from a Levite's daughter is not redeemed (whether or not the father is Jewish). Similarly, the first-born son of a kohen's daughter, as long as the father is Jewish.

=== Bat Kohen ===
Some sources state that a bat kohen (daughter of a priest) may accept pidyon haben money, just as a priest may, but this option is not accepted in practice.

== Ceremony ==
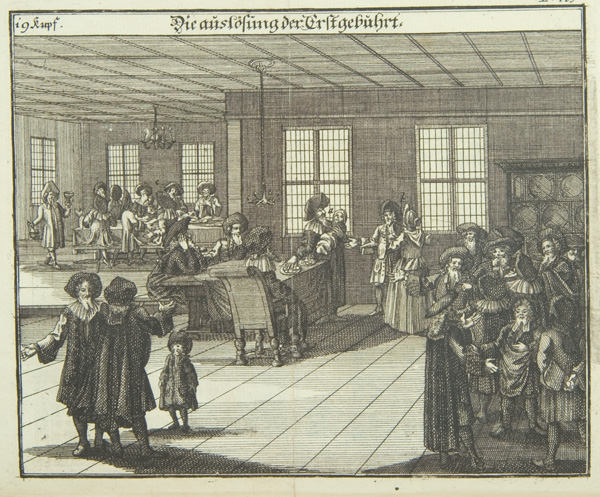
Redemption of the First-born (1724), from Juedisches Ceremoniel

In the traditional ceremony, the father brings the child to the kohen and recites a formula, or responds to ritual questions, indicating that this is the Israelite mother's firstborn son and he has come to redeem him as commanded in the Torah. If the family is Sephardic, the kohen asks the mother if the child is indeed her firstborn son and if she did not miscarry in the past. The kohen asks the father which he would rather have, the child or the five silver shekels which he must pay. The father states that he prefers the child to the money, then he recites a blessing and hands over five silver coins (or an equivalent amount of total silver). The kohen holds the coins over the child and declares that the redemption price is received and accepted in place of the child. He then blesses the child. (Note: The kohen would not receive the child if the father refused to redeem the boy. The function of the question is merely to formally endear the mitzvah to the father.)

The ceremony traditionally takes place before a minyan of 10 men. The child is sometimes presented on a silver tray, surrounded by jewelry lent for the occasion by women in attendance. This is to contrast with the golden calf, when gold and jewelry was used for a sinful purpose.

The event starts by beginning a festive meal (unlike a brit milah or wedding where the meal comes after the ceremony). If the family is Sephardic, the event starts with the ceremony. Guests in some places are given cloves of garlic and cubes of sugar to take home: these strongly flavored foods can be used to flavor a large quantity of food which will in some sense extend the mitzvah of participation in the ceremony to all who eat them.

== Coins ==
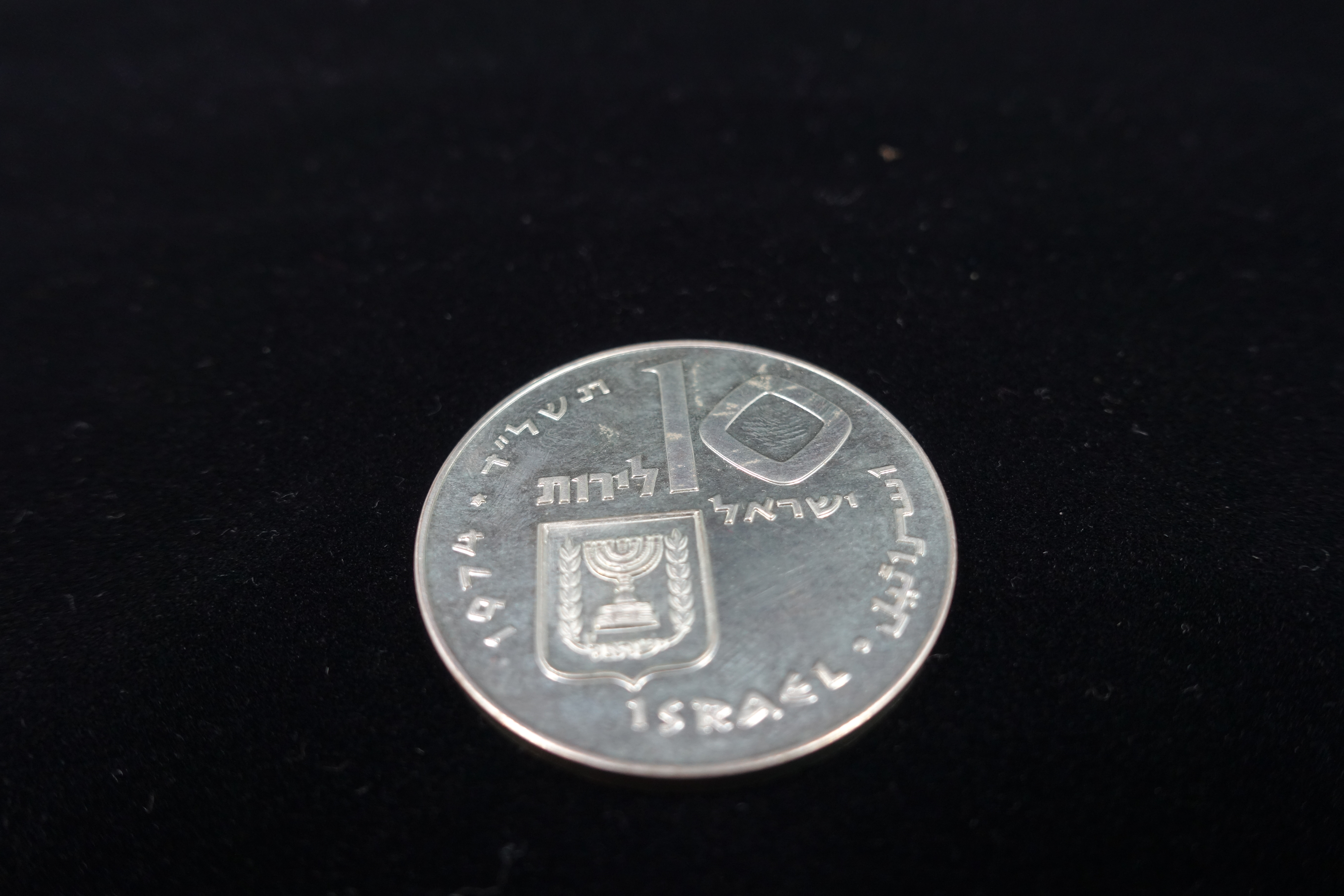
Pidyon haben coin from Israel, 1974. In the collection of the Jewish Museum of Switzerland. Such coins are offered in sets of 5 by the Bank of Israel.

Contemporary religious authorities believe that the Shekel HaKodesh (Holy Shekel) of the Temple was larger and of purer silver content than the standard shekel used for trade in ancient Israel. Halakha requires that the coins used have a requisite total amount of actual silver. There are varying opinions as to the correct amount of silver, they fall in between 96.15 grams and 102 grams. Coins which do not contain the requisite amount of silver do not result in a valid redemption.

The Israeli Mint has minted two sets of coins for this purpose: an edition of 20.57 gram silver commemorative coins, five of which would come to 102 grams of silver, and a special edition 26 gram silver commemorative coins, five of which would come to 130 grams of silver. Pre-1936 American silver dollars (commonly known as Morgan dollars or Peace dollars) weigh 26.73 grams of 90% silver content and hence contain 24.06g of pure silver, although such coins have become increasingly rare (modern U.S. coins contain no silver). Four American Silver Eagle coins, specially minted coins sold to collectors and investors which contain 31.1035 grams of 99.9% pure silver, or five of the above-mentioned specially minted silver coins of Israel are commonly used for pidyon haben in the United States. One may use silver bullion as well; it is not necessary for it to be a coin per se.

Moreover, it is not mandatory to redeem the son in silver coins, and the ceremony can be held using any movable object worth the same value as five silver coins in the same day, other than promissory notes, which is not acceptable for the ceremony. Later halachic authorities discuss whether paper money is included in promissory notes; according to the stringent approach, it is possible that modern coins, which are fiat money not valued according to their metal value, would be the same as paper money.

Although the silver coins are the payment to the kohen according to the 613 commandments and are one of the twenty-four priestly gifts, they are sometimes returned by the kohen to the family as a gift for the child, although halachic authorities stipulate that, for the pidyon to be valid, the choice of returning the coins as a gift rests entirely upon the kohen whereas pressuring the kohen to do so would render the redemption invalid.

=== Pidyon certificate ===
Some kohens officiating for the pidyon ceremony will present the father with a "Pidyon HaBen certificate" of the pidyon transaction, the certificate will usually be framed for display and may serve as a receipt (and evidence) that the transaction was done according to halacha (i.e. the kohen was not pressured to return the coins), with the kohen and two witnesses ("Eidim") affixing their signatures at the time of the ceremony.

== See also ==
- Fast of the Firstborn

== Bibliography ==
- Levenson, Jon D. (1 January 1993). The Death and Resurrection of the Beloved Son. New Haven: Yale University Press. ISBN 0-300-06511-6.
