= Hashkiveinu =

Jewish evening prayer

In Judaism, Hashkiveinu (Hebrew: הַשְׁכִּיבֵנוּ) is the second blessing following the Shema during Maariv. It is a petitionary prayer to lie down in peace at night and return to life the following day.

== Shabbat/Yom Tov version ==
On weekdays, this prayer ends with the words Shomer Amo Yisrael L'Ad. This is seen as appropriate for weekdays, when men go in and out in their weekday pursuits, and come in need of divine protection.

On Shabbat and Jewish holidays, an alternate version of this blessing is recited. The blessing is ended with the words "Who spreads the shelter of peace upon us, upon all of his people Israel, and Jerusalem." The words "and spread over us the shelter of Your peace", which are normally recited earlier in the paragraph, are repeated before the closing. This reflects the peace that comes with these special days, and that putting Jerusalem above everything else is essential.

In the custom of Babylonia, they recited Shomer Amo Yisrael L'Ad even on Shabbat. In the custom of the Land of Israel, they always recited the extended version, even on weekdays. The contemporary custom, adopted in virtually all communities, is a compromise.

In the Sephardic and Yemenite rites, the phrases "Shield us from every enemy, plague, sword, famine, and sorrow. Remove the adversary from before and behind us" are omitted on the Sabbath, because the sabbath itself provides protection.

In the Romaniote rite, the blessing was much longer on Sabbat: "Lay us down, LORD God, in peace, and raise us again, our King, to [new] life. Spread over us Your tabernacle of peace, Blessed are You, LORD, who spreads Your tabernacle of peace over us and all His people Israel and Jerusalem." This is similar to various fragments from the Cairo Geniza.

== Text ==
There may be slight differences, depending on which nusach (regional liturgical rite) one follows.

=== Traditional ===
The prayer's text according to Nusach Ashkenaz, in each of the Hebrew script, Hebrew as transliterated into the Roman alphabet, and English:

הַשְׁכִּיבֵנוּ יְיָ אֱלֹהֵינוּ לְשָׁלוֹם
וְהַעֲמִידֵנוּ מַלְכֵּנוּ לְחַיִּים.
וּפְרוֹשׂ עָלֵינוּ סֻכַּת שְׁלוֹמֶךָ
וְתַקְּנֵנוּ בְּעֵצָה טוֹבָה מִלְּפָנֶיךָ
וְהוֹשִׁיעֵנוּ לְמַעַן שְׁמֶךָ
וְהָגֵן בַּעֲדֵנוּ.
וְהָסֵר מֵעָלֵינוּ אוֹיֵב
דֶּבֶר וְחֶרֶב וְרָעָב וְיָגוֹן
וְהָסֵר שָׂטָן מִלְּפָנֵינוּ וּמֵאַחֲרֵינוּ
וּבְצֵל כְּנָפֶיךָ תַּסְתִּירֵנוּ
כִּי אֵל שׁוֹמְרֵנוּ וּמִצִּלֵּנוּ
אַתָּה כִּי אֵל מֶלֶךְ חַנּוּן וְרַחוּם
אַתָּה וּשְׁמֹר צֵאתֵנוּ וּבוֹאֵנוּ לְחַיִּים
וּלְשָׁלוֹם מֵעַתָּה וְעַד עוֹלָם.

Haškîb̲ēnu ʾAd̲onāy ʾElohenu ləšālom,
wəhaʿamid̲ēnu malkēnu ləḥayyim.
Up̄əroś ʿālēnu sukkat̲ šəlomek̲ā
wət̲aqqənēnu bəʿēṣāh ṭob̲āh milləp̄ānek̲ā
wəhošiʿēnu ləmaʿan šəmek̲ā
wəhāḡēn baʿad̲ēnu.
Wəhāsēr mēʿālēnu ʾoyēb̲
deb̲er wəḥereb̲ wərāʿāb̲ wəyāḡon
wəhāsēr śāṭān milləp̄ānēnu umēʾaḥarēnu
ub̲əṣēl kənāp̄ēk̲ā tastirēnu
ki ʾēl šomərēnu umiṣṣillēnu
ʾattā ki ʾēl melek̲ ḥannun wəraḥum
ʾattā ušəmōr ṣēt̲ēnu ub̲oʾēnu ləḥayyim
uləšālom mēʿattāh wəʿad̲ ʿolām.

Lay us down, LORD God, in peace, and raise us up again, our King, to [new] life.
Spread over us Your tabernacle of peace,
And guide us with Your good counsel.
Save us for Your name's sake.
Shield us from every enemy, plague, sword, famine, and sorrow.
Remove the adversary from before and behind us.
Shelter us in the shadow of Your wings,
Guard our going out and coming in, and grant us life and peace, now and always.

On weekdays, the prayer ends:

בָּרוּךְ אַתָּה יְיָ שׁוֹמֵר עַמּוֹ יִשְׂרָאֵל לָעַד

Bāruk̲ ʾattā ʾAd̲onāy šomēr ʿammo Yiśrāʾēl lāʿad̲

Blessed are You, LORD, who forever protects His people of Israel.

On Shabbat, the prayer ends:

וּפְרוֹשׂ עָלֵינוּ סֻכַּת שְׁלוֹמֶךָ
בָּרוּךְ אַתָּה יְיָ (הַ)פּוֹרֵשׂ סֻכַּת שָׁלוֹם עָלֵינוּ
וְעַל כָּל עַמּוֹ יִשְׂרָאֵל וְעַל יְרוּשָׁלָיִם.

Up̄əroś ʿālēnu sukkat̲ šəlomek̲ā
Bārûk̲ ʾattā ʾAd̲onāy (hap)porēś sukkat̲ šālom ʿālēnu
wəʿal kol ʿammo Yiśrāʾēl wəʿal Yərušālāyim

Spread over us Your tabernacle of peace,
Blessed are You, LORD, who spreads Your tabernacle of peace over us,
And over all His people Israel and over Jerusalem.

=== Mishkan Tefilla ===
The Mishkan T'filah is a prayerbook prepared by the Central Conference of American Rabbis (CCAR) for Reform Jewish congregations worldwide.

הַשְׁכִּיבֵֽנוּ, יְיָ אֱלֹהֵֽנוּ, לְשָׁלוֹם,
וְהַעֲמִידֵנוּ שׁוֹמְרֵֽנוּ לְחַיִּים,
וּפְרֹשׂ עָלֵֽנוּ סֻכַּת שְׁלוֹמֶֽךָ,
וְתַקְּנֵֽנוּ בְּעֵצָה טוֹבָה מִלְּפָנֶֽךָ,
וְהוֹשִׁיעֵֽנוּ לְמַֽעַן שְׁמֶךָ.
וְהָגֵן בַּעֲדֵֽנוּ,
וְהָסֵר מֵעָלֵֽינוּ אוֹיֵב,
דֶּֽבֶר, וְחֶֽרֶב, וְרָעָב, וְיָגוֹן,
וְהָרְחֵק מִמֶּֽנּוּ עָוֹן וָפֶֽשַׁע.
וּבְצֵל כְּנָפֶֽיךָ תַּסְתִּירֵֽנוּ,
כִּי אֵל שׁוֹמְרֵֽנוּ וּמַצִּילֵֽנוּ אָֽתָּה,
כִּי אֵל חַנּוּן וְרַחוּם אָֽתָּה.
וּשְׁמֹר צֵאתֵֽנוּ וּבוֹאֵֽנוּ לְחַיִּים
וּלְשָׁלֹם מֵעַתָּה וְעַד עוֹלָם.
בָּרוּךְ אַתָּה יְיָ, שׁוֹמֵר עַמּוֹ יִשְׂרָאֵל לָעַד

Haškîb̲ēnu ʾAd̲onāy ʾElohenu ləšālom
wəhaʿamid̲ēnu šomerēnu ləḥayyim.
Up̄əroś ʿālēnu sukkat̲ šəlomek̲ā.
wət̲aqqənēnu bəʿēṣāh ṭob̲ā milləp̄ānek̲ā;
wəhošiʿēnu ləmaʿan šəmek̲ā.
wəhāḡēn baʿad̲ēnu.
Wəhāsēr mēʿālēnu ʾoyēb̲
deb̲er, wəḥereb̲, wərāʿāb̲, wəyāḡon
wəhārəḥēq mimmenu ʿāwon wāp̲eśaʿ.
Ub̲əṣēl kənāp̄ek̲ā tastirēnu
ki ʾēl šomərēnu umiṣṣillēnu ʾattā
ki ʾēl ḥannun wəraḥum ʾattā
ušəmōr ṣēt̲ēnu ub̲oʾēnu ləḥayyim
uləšālom mēʿattāh wəʿad̲ ʿolām.
Bāruk̲ ʾattā ʾAd̲onāy šomēr ʿammo Yiśrāʾēl lāʿad̲.

Grant, O God, that we lie down in peace,
and raise us up, our Guardian, to life renewed.
Spread over us the shelter of Your peace.
Guide us with Your good counsel;
for Your Name’s sake, be our help.
Shield and shelter us beneath the shadow of Your wings.
Defend us against enemies, illness, war, famine and sorrow.
Distance us from wrongdoing.
For You, God, watch over us and deliver us.
For You, God, are gracious and merciful.
Guard our going and coming, to life and to peace evermore.
Blessed are you, O God, who preserves his people Israel forever.
