= Sfeka d'yoma =

Concept and legal principle in Jewish law

Sfeka d'yoma (Jewish Babylonian Aramaic: ספיקא דיומא, lit. 'doubt about the day', or doubt regarding the exact date of the day) is a concept and legal principle in Jewish law which explains why some Jewish holidays are celebrated for one day in the Land of Israel but for two days outside the Land. The implications of sfeka d'yoma are discussed in Rosh Hashanah 21a and in the commentaries and poskim.

== Background ==
Before the destruction of the Temple in Jerusalem, and prior to the permanent establishment or "fixing" of the Hebrew solar-lunar calendar, the onset of each month, known as Rosh Chodesh (Hebrew: ראש חודש, lit. "head/start of the month/new moon") was declared by the Sanhedrin. This declaration was crucially important, as it affected the dates on which the holidays in that month would occur. The Sanhedrin would declare a new month only after accepting the testimony of two witnesses who attested to the sighting of the new moon. If the witnesses were contradicted, or not enough witnesses came forth, the Sanhedrin would convene on the following day to receive testimony.

Upon accepting the testimony of two witnesses, the Sanhedrin would sanctify the new month. Messengers would then be sent throughout the Land of Israel, and bonfires lit on high places, to let everyone know the correct date of the new moon. While this system insured that Jews living in Israel would immediately know the date of the new month and, by extension, the dates of the holidays that fell in that month, the news would travel slower to Jews living outside the Land – particularly in Babylonia, where there was a large Jewish population following the destruction of the First Temple and during the era of the Second Temple. Hence, the dates on which the Jewish holidays would occur in each month would be uncertain until such time as every community would know exactly when the new month had been declared by the Sanhedrin.

Since there was doubt about which day to observe the holidays, it was established that the holiday, or Yom Tov, be celebrated on two days rather than one. Based on the nature of the start of the lunar months, there could evidently be a margin of error of only one day.

=== Fixing of the calendar ===
A few centuries after the destruction of the Second Temple and the worldwide exile of the Jewish people, the Jewish community in Israel began to decline. The calendar was then fixed (meaning that it was permanently set up by the Jewish sages). With this fixed calendar, there is no doubt about which day the holidays in each month occur.

Nevertheless, Jewish communities outside the Land of Israel continue to celebrate two days for certain Jewish holidays because that is the minhag (custom) that the Jewish sages established during an era when it was needed. This is referred to as minhag avoteinu b'yadenu (Hebrew: מנהג אבותינו בידינו, lit. "the custom of our forefathers is in our hands") – meaning that Jews have traditionally accepted and practiced what their ancestors have handed down to them, according to the long-standing classical view that established customs may not be changed.

== Holidays that reflect sfeka d'yoma ==
Sfeka d'yoma is incorporated into all holidays mentioned in the Torah (Pentateuch) with the exception of Yom Kippur.

- Passover – in the Land of Israel, Passover is a seven-day holiday. Both the first day, 15 Nisan, and the last day, 21 Nisan, are celebrated as a Yom Tov. In the Jewish diaspora, the first Yom Tov is celebrated on 15 and 16 Nisan, and the last Yom Tov on 21 and 22 Nisan (thereby creating an eight-day holiday). In keeping with the principle that a sfeka d'yoma is treated as a bona fide day of Yom Tov, the Passover Seder is conducted on both the first and second nights of Passover in the Jewish diaspora.
- Shavuot – in the Land of Israel, Shavuot is celebrated on 6 Sivan. In the Jewish diaspora, it is celebrated on 6 and 7 Sivan.
- Rosh Hashana is celebrated for two days (1 and 2 Tishrei) both in the Land of Israel and outside it. This exception to the rule that sfeka d'yoma is not relevant in the Land of Israel is because Rosh Hashana is the first day of the month Tishrei. In the days of the Sanhedrin, the messengers could not leave Jerusalem on the festival itself (because of festival law restrictions). Therefore, no one in the whole Land of Israel (outside Jerusalem itself) would know when the beginning of Tishrei, and thereby the holiday of Rosh Hashana, were declared.
- Sukkot – in the Land of Israel, Sukkot is a seven-day holiday, and the first day, 15 Tishrei, is celebrated as a Yom Tov. In the Jewish diaspora, the first and second days, 15 and 16 Tishrei, are celebrated as a Yom Tov.
- Shemini Atzeret – in the Land of Israel, Shemini Atzeret is celebrated on 22 Tishrei. In the Jewish diaspora, it is celebrated on 22 and 23 Tishrei, the second day of which is observed as Simchat Torah. Due to the sfeka d'yoma regarding the Yom Tov of Sukkot, there is an additional doubt as to whether the first day of Shemini Atzeret is in fact the last day of Sukkot. The Shulchan Aruch rules that outside the Land of Israel, Jews must eat in the sukkah on Shemini Atzeret without reciting the traditional blessing over this mitzvah.

== Holidays that do not reflect sfeka d'yoma ==
- Yom Kippur is celebrated on 10 Tishrei (one day only) both in the Land of Israel and outside it. Yom Kippur is the only Torah festival where sfeka d'yoma was not instituted; a two-day Yom Kippur outside Israel would require a difficult and unhealthy two-day fast from both eating and drinking.

Sfeka d'yoma was not instituted for holidays that are not mentioned in the Torah but were established later under rabbinic law. These include:

- Purim—although mentioned in the later Biblical book of Esther, Purim is a Rabbinic holiday. It is celebrated on 14 Adar almost everywhere. It is celebrated on 15 Adar in Jerusalem, and partially in other cities in Israel, but for reasons unrelated to sfeka d'yoma.
- Hanukkah is celebrated for eight days, starting 25 Kislev, both in the Land of Israel and outside it.
- Tisha B'Av and other Rabbinic fasts are observed only one day each.

== See also ==
- Testimony in Jewish law
- Yom tov sheni shel galuyot
