= Nusach Sefard =

Forms of the Jewish siddurim

Nusach Sefard, Nusach Sepharad, or Nusach Sfard, is the name for various forms of the Jewish siddurim designed to reconcile Ashkenazi customs with the kabbalistic customs of Isaac Luria (more commonly known as the Arizal). To this end, it has incorporated the wording of Nusach Edot ha-Mizrach or Nusach Hasfaradim, the prayer book of Sephardi Jews, into certain prayers. Nusach Sefard is used nearly universally by Hasidim, as well as by some other Ashkenazi Jews (especially Dati Leumi Jews), but has not gained significant acceptance by Sephardi Jews. Some Hasidic dynasties use their own version of the Nusach Sefard siddur, sometimes with a notable divergence between different versions.

== Prayers and customs ==
Some versions are nearly identical to Nusach Ashkenaz, while others come far closer to Nusach Hasfaradim or Nusach Edot ha-Mizrach: most versions fall somewhere in between. All versions attempt to incorporate the customs of the Arizal, with greater or lesser success.

== History ==
There are many differences between the [various] prayer books, between the Sefardi rite, the Catalonian rite, the Ashkenazi rite, and the like. Concerning this matter, my master [the Ari] of blessed memory told me that there are twelve windows in heaven corresponding to the twelve tribes, and that the prayer of each tribe ascends through its own special gate. This is the secret of the twelve gates mentioned at the end of [the book of] Yechezkel. There is no question that were the prayers of all the tribes the same, there would be no need for twelve windows and gates, each gate having a path of its own. Rather, without a doubt it necessarily follows that because their prayers are different, each and every tribe requires its own gate. For in accordance with the source and root of the souls of that tribe, so must be its prayer rite. It is therefore fitting that each and every individual should maintain the customary liturgical rite of his forefathers. For you do not know who is from this tribe and who from that tribe. And since his forefathers practiced a certain custom, perhaps he is from that tribe for whom this custom is appropriate, and if he comes now and changes it, his prayer may not ascend [to heaven], when it is not offered in accordance with that rite.

— Sha'ar ha-Kavanot, Inyan Nusach ha-Tefila

It is generally held that every Jew is bound to observe the mitzvot (commandments of Judaism) by following the customs appropriate to their family of origin. For this reason, a number of rabbis disapprove of the adoption of Nusach Sefard by Ashkenazi Jews.

However, it was a common Kabbalistic belief that the Sephardic rite, especially in the form used by the Arizal, had more spiritual potency than the Ashkenazi one. Many Eastern Jewish communities, such as the Persian Jews and the Yemenite Jews, accordingly adopted the Sephardic rite with Lurianic additions in preference to their previous traditional rites. In the same way, in the 17th and 18th centuries, many Kabbalistic groups in Europe adopted the Lurianic rite in preference to the Ashkenazi. This was, however, the custom of very restricted circles and did not come into widespread public use until the mid-to-late 18th-century rise of Hasidic Judaism.

Luria taught that twelve gates of prayer exist corresponding to the twelve tribes of ancient Israel and to the twelve Jewish communities that existed in Safed in his lifetime. Twelve nusachs for Jewish prayer—nasachot ha-tefillah—emanated accordingly.

In alteration of this Lurianic concept, especially in 18th/19th-century Hasidism, the claim emerged that, while in general one should keep to one's minhag of origin, the Nusach Sefard reached a believed "thirteenth gate" (Shaar ha-Kollel) in Heaven for those who do not know their own tribe. Nusach Sefard, with its variant Nusach Ari, became almost universal among Hasidim as well as some other Ashkenazi Jews, but has not gained significant acceptance by Sephardi Jews. One consequence was that, before the establishment of the State of Israel and in Israel's early years, it was the predominant rite used by Ashkenazim in the Holy Land, except for certain pockets of traditional Lithuanian Jews. One reason for this was that the Land of Israel was regarded as part of the Sephardic world, so it was felt that new immigrants should adopt the local rite. In recent decades, following the immigration of many Ashkenazi Jews from America, the millennia-old Ashkenazi rite has regained a strong following. Many of the various sects and dynasties of Hasidism use their own version of Nusach Sfard.

== Variants ==
Many Hasidic groups have slightly varying versions. A significant difference compared to Nusach Ashkenaz resides in the text of kaddish. For example, Nusach Sfard adds the words "ויצמח פורקניה ויקרב משיחיה" (may his redemption sprout and his Messiah approach), which is taken from the Sephardic kaddish.

More differences arise in specific prayers, such as the opening words to Ahava rabbah (אהבה רבה) changing to Ahavat Olam (אהבת עולם). This changes the meaning from God's abundant love to God's love of the world. Additionally, in the Amidah, many changes have been made.

Blessing	Changes (from Nusach Ashkenaz)
Avos (Patriarchs)	n/a
Michayeh HaMesim (Revival of the dead)	n/a
Atah Kadosh (You are holy)	Adds "Ki El Melech Gadol v'Kadosh Atah"
Atah Chonein (Knowledge)	Removes "De'ah Bina v'Haskel", replaces it with "Chuchama Bina V'daas"
Hashivenu (Repentance)	n/a
S'lach lanu (Forgiveness)	Replaces "Ki Mochel v'Soleach atah" with "Ki el tov v'Salah atah"
Re'eh (Nah) v'Unyanu (Redemption)	Adds "nah" after Re'eh, adds "Geulah" after "u'Galenu", adds "el" after "Shimecha Ki"
Refainu (Healing)	None, but there is a separate version that some say
Boraych Aleinu (Sustenance)	Adds "Ki el tov u'Meitiv atah u'Mivaraych Hashanim"
Tikah B'Shofar (Ingathering of Israel)	Adds "l'artzeinu"
Hashiva Shofitenu (Judgement)	Adds "Mehera", adds "b'Tzedek", changes "Bamishpat" to "u'mishpat"
V'lamalshinim (Heretics)	Adds "u'Sachlem v'Sashipiem v'Sachniem"
Al Hatzadikim (The Righteous)	Adds "Beis Sofereihem", adds "nah"
v'LiYerushalayim (Rebuilding of Jerusalem)	n/a
Es Tzemach Dovid (Messiah)	Some add "u'Matzpeim l'Yeshua"
Av Harachaman [Shema Koleinu] (Hear our voice)	Adds "av Harachaman" at the start, adds "Chaneinu v'Aneinu u'Shma Tefillaseinu", adds "Kol Peh"
Retzeh (Temple service)	Adds "Mehera" (In Ya'aleh V'Yavo, on Rosh Chodesh or any of the Yomim Tovim, add "chaim Tovim")
Modiim (Thanksgiving)	Adds "Tzoreinu"
v'Al Kulam (Thanksgiving)	Changes "Yisborach v'yisromam" to "Yisboraych v'Yisromeim v'Yisna'asei", adds "vayivoruchu es shimecha hagadol ha'emes li'olam ki tov" and adds "ha'el hatov"
Sim Shalom (Peace)	Adds "chaim," adds "ci'echad Yachad," and adds "bi'rov oz v'shalom"

=== Variations within the Nusach ===
Within Nusach Sefard, individuals follow different opinions on whether to say extra words or not. The changes above in the Amidah are listed from the Millerbooks' Nusach Sefard Beis Tefillah Siddur HaShalem. Other variations include the addition of the word "yisborach" after a line in the Kaddish. There are differences of opinion on how to respond after "Shmay d'Kudisha Biruch Hu". Some say "Biruch hu", others say "Omein", and others say nothing at all. Siddurs vary, so checking which minhagim one's siddur has is important.

=== Nusach Maharitz ===
Nusach Maharitz, referring to and originating with Rabbi Yosef Tzvi Dushinsky, is the nusach used by most Dushinsky Hasidim. The nusach is a mixture of Nusach Ashkenaz and Nusach Sefard, differing from Nusach Ashkenaz only when it can be proven from the writings of the students of the Ari that he did otherwise, yielding a blend of elements from both rites almost equally.
