= Yom tov sheni shel galuyot =

Extra Jewish festival day outside Israel

Halakhic texts relating to this article
- Babylonian Talmud: Beitzah 4a-6a and Hagigah 8a-b
- Jerusalem Talmud: Eruvin 3:9, Pesachim 5:4, Yevamot 11:7, and Nazir 8:1
- Mishneh Torah: Sefer Zmanim, Hilchot Shevitot Yom Tov 1:22-24, and Kiddoush Hahodesh 5:5-13
- Shulchan Aruch: Orach Chayim 490, 494:2, 496, 503, 513, 526, 662, 663, 666, 669 and Yoreh De'ah 299

Yom tov sheni shel galuyot (Hebrew: יוֹם טוֹב שֵׁנִי שֶׁל גָּלוּיוֹת), frequently abbreviated as yom tov sheni (יוֹם טוֹב שֵׁנִי, 'second festival day'), means "the second festival day in the Diaspora". It is a principle in Halakha that mandates the observance of an additional day for Jewish holidays outside the Land of Israel.

Yom tov sheni was established as a gezera (Hebrew: גְּזֵרָה, lit. '[rabbinic] decree') by the rabbis of the Sanhedrin in the Second Temple period, and the decree remains in effect in both Orthodox Judaism and Conservative Judaism. Reform Judaism abolished it in 1846, and Reconstructionist Judaism also largely did the same, although many Reform and Reconstructionist Jews hold two Passover Seders.

== In Jewish sources ==
The need for a second festival day arises from problems encountered by Jews living in the Diaspora following the Babylonian exile. The Jewish calendar is a lunar system with months of 29 or 30 days. In Temple times, the length of the month depended on witnesses who had seen the new moon coming to the Temple in Jerusalem. Following confirmation of their evidence, a new Jewish month would be proclaimed. News of this proclamation was subsequently sent out to all Jewish communities. If no witnesses arrived, the new month was proclaimed the following day. Those communities who didn't receive word of the precise date of the beginning of the new month by the time of a festival, would keep the festival for two days, to account for the eventuality the new month wasn't proclaimed only the following day.

Later (by Hillel II, according to tradition), the Jewish calendar was fixed. Instead of the new month being determined by observation of the moon in Jerusalem, the calendar was fixed so that new months could be calculated ahead of time by anyone. This eliminated the uncertainty of those who lived far from Jerusalem about the dating of holidays. Nevertheless, rabbinic authorities decreed that Diaspora communities continue to observe two days of holidays, for two reasons: to preserve their ancestral custom; and out of fear that the non-Jewish authorities might prohibit Torah study and Diaspora Jews would no longer know how to reliably calculate the calendar.

== Observance ==
The second day is observed for all Biblically ordained festivals, with exceptions (see below). Thus, Shavuot is one day in the Land of Israel and two days in the Diaspora. Pesach is a seven-day festival in the Land of Israel, the first and last days of which are holy days, with five days of Chol HaMoed in between. In the Diaspora, it is an eight-day festival, with a pair of holy days at the start and finish, and four days Chol HaMoed.

Sukkot is a seven-day festival in the Land of Israel, the first day of which is a holy day, followed by six days of Chol Hamoed. These are, in turn, followed immediately on the eighth day by the separate-but-related holy day of Shemini Atzeret. In the Diaspora, the first two days are holy days, and are followed by five days of Chol Hamoed. These are in turn followed by two holy days of Shemini Atzeret. However, in the Diaspora, the name "Shemini Atzeret" is usually used only to refer to the first of the two days; the second day is called Simchat Torah. Furthermore, on the (first day of) Shemini Atzeret outside of Israel, the one continues to sit in the Sukkah without a blessing, as it might really be the seventh day.

There are two exceptions to the rule. The fast day of Yom Kippur is one day even in the Diaspora, due to the difficulty of a two-day fast. Also, Rosh Hashanah is two days even in the Land of Israel, because it falls on the first day of the month; thus, even people living in the Land of Israel would not find out the correct day until after the holiday. Conservative Judaism uniformly observes two days of Rosh Hashanah as well, as do some Reform congregations.

== Visitors from abroad in the Land of Israel and residents of Israel visiting abroad ==
Jews who live outside Israel observe a second day of Yom Tov, and most do so even when staying in the Land of Israel as long as their permanent residence is outside of Israel. This results in a situation where while residents of Israel are already observing weekday customs, visitors from abroad are still observing Yom Tov and are prohibited from work. Conversely, residents of Israel who are abroad, in a place with a Jewish community, only observe one day, and on the second day they do not make Kiddush, pray weekday prayers, and put on tefillin in private. However, they are still prohibited from work, even in private. The opinion of the Chacham Tzvi in his responsa is that a person from abroad who is in the Land of Israel is obligated to observe only one day, and there is room to infer this from the opinion of Rabbi Shneur Zalman of Liadi in his Shulchan Aruch, in its second edition. Most Jews living abroad follow the opinion of the majority of poskim to observe two days even in the Land of Israel, but some celebrate only one day.

In certain synagogues in the Land of Israel where there is a concentration of people from abroad, there are prayer services for Yom Tov intended for visitors from abroad. The poskim have discussed whether such public services in the Land of Israel are permitted, with some prohibiting them, and others permitting them.

== See also ==
- Laws and customs of the Land of Israel in Judaism
  - Impurity of the land of the nations
- Isru chag refers to the day after each of the Three Pilgrimage Festivals.
- Chol HaMoed, the intermediate days of Passover and Sukkot.
- Mimouna, a traditional North African Jewish celebration held the day after Passover.
- Pesach Sheni, is exactly one month after 14 Nisan.
- Purim Katan is when during a Jewish leap year Purim is celebrated during Adar II so that the 14th of Adar I is then called Purim Katan.
- Shushan Purim falls on Adar 15 and is the day on which Jews in Jerusalem celebrate Purim.
- Sfeka d'yoma, a concept and legal principle in Jewish law which explains why some Jewish holidays are celebrated for one day in the Land of Israel but for two days outside the Land.
- Yom Kippur Katan is a practice observed by some Jews on the day preceding each Rosh Chodesh or New-Moon Day.

== Bibliography ==
- Zimmels, Hirsch Jakob, "The Controversy about the Second Day of the Festival," in Samuel Belkin, ed., Abraham Weiss Jubilee Volume (New York, 1964), 139-168.
- Jacob Katz, "The Orthodox Defense of the Second Day of the Festivals," Divine Law in Human Hands: Case Studies in Halakhic Flexibility (Jerusalem: Hebrew University Magnes Press, 1998), 255-319
- David Yerachmiel Fried, Yom tov sheni kehilkhato Jerusalem 5748 (1988) (Hebrew)
- יום טוב שני של גלויות [Yom tov sheni shel galuyot]. Jewish Encyclopedia Daat (in Hebrew). Herzog College. (in Hebrew)
- Kaufmann Kohler & W. Wilner, "Second day of festivals" Jewish Encyclopedia, 1906
