= Emet VeEmunah =

Jewish evening prayer

Emet V'Emunah (True and faithful) is the paragraph that is recited immediately following Shema during Maariv, two fundamental prayers of virtually all forms of Judaism practiced today. Its recitation fulfills the obligation to recall the Exodus from Egypt during the evening.

== Themes ==
Emet V'Emunah is a parallel prayer to Emet Vayatziv, which is recited during Shacharit immediately following Shema. But unlike Emet Vayatziv, which speaks of the redemptions from the past of the Jewish ancestors, Emet V'Emunah relates the future redemption of the Jewish people.

Emet V'Emunah describes the chosenness of the Jewish people. The prayer describes the Jewish people as unique and distinctive, and with a mission to God.

== Alternative version for Sabbath ==
In the Italian rite (based on the Siddur of Rav Saadya Gaon), there is an alternative version of this blessing for the Sabbath, beginning with "emet ve-emunah ba-shevii".
