= Nusach Ashkenaz =

Religious liturgy of Ashkenazi Jews

Nusach Ashkenaz is a style of Jewish liturgy conducted by Ashkenazi Jews. It is primarily a way to order and include prayers, and differs from Nusach Sefard (as used by the Hasidim) and Baladi-rite prayer, and still more from the Sephardic rite proper, in the placement and presence of certain prayers.

== Subdivisions ==
Nusach Ashkenaz can be subdivided into the German or Western branch—Minhag Ashkenaz—used in Western and Central Europe, and the Polish-Lithuanian or Eastern branch—Minhag Polin—used in Central and Eastern Europe, the United States, and some Israeli Ashkenazim, particularly those who identify as Litvaks ("Lithuanian").

The term Minhag Ashkenaz (the Western Ashkenazic rite) historically applied only to the nusach of southern German Jewry (in recent centuries defined very roughly as those south and west of the Elbe), most notably the community of Frankfurt. In the Middle Ages, the border seems to have been further east. Northeastern German communities, such as Hamburg and Berlin, followed Minhag Polin, although their musical tradition and pronunciation of Hebrew, and some of the traditions about the prayers included, were more reminiscent of the western communities than of Poland proper or even Austria–Hungary.

There are a number of minor differences between the Israeli and American Ashkenazi practice in that Israeli Ashkenazi Judaism follows some practices of the Vilna Gaon (see Perushim § Influence) and Sephardic rite. For example, most Ashkenazic communities in Israel recite Ein Keloheinu during the week, as is the Sephardic practice.

The British nusach—Minhag Anglia—is based on those of both Germany and Poland, seen in the Authorised Daily Prayer Book published by the Orthodox United Synagogue. Minhag Anglia also has a broader influence on the structure and hashkafa of British Jews more generally.

== History ==
Leopold Zunz claimed that the Ashkenazi rite descended from the ancient Eretz Israel minhag, while the Sephardi rite originated in Babylonia. Hakham Moses Gaster, in his introduction to the prayer book of London's Spanish and Portuguese Jews, made precisely the opposite claim. All Jewish liturgies today are fundamentally Babylonian, with only a few usages from the land of Israel surviving the standardization process. Most differences preserved since the time of the Geonim, particularly those from Eretz Yisrael, are now obsolete.

Medieval Ashkenazi scholars stated that the Ashkenazi rite is largely derived from the Siddur Rab Amram and the minor Talmudic tractate Soferim. This may be true, but it does not necessarily support Gaster's claim of Babylonian origin. As pointed out by Louis Ginzberg, the Siddur Rab Amram had been heavily edited to reflect the Old Spanish rite. The Ashkenazi rite also contains early liturgical poetry from the land of Israel that was eliminated from other rites, and this fact was the main support for Zunz's theory.

In the broadest sense, the earliest recorded form of the Ashkenazi rite may be found in an early medieval prayer book called Machzor Vitry. This, however, like the Siddur Rashi published a century later, records the Old French rite rather than the Ashkenazi (German) rite proper (though the differences are small). The Old French rite mostly died out after the expulsion of Jews from France in 1394, but some portions of it remained in the High Holiday liturgy of the Appam community of Northwest Italy until shortly after World War II (which has since gone extinct). Both the Old French and the Ashkenazi rites have a loose family resemblance to other European rites, such as the Italian, Romaniote, and Provençal rites, and to a lesser extent the Catalan and Old Spanish rites: the current Sephardic rite has since been standardized to conform with the rulings of the Geonim, thereby showing some degree of convergence with the Babylonian and North African rites.

The liturgical compositions of Byzantine Jewry, especially the piyyutim (hymns), found their way through Italy to Ashkenaz, being preserved in most modern Ashkenazi machzorim.

== Ashkenazi practices ==
- Tefillin are worn on Chol HaMoed (except on Shabbat Chol HaMoed). The original custom was to wear tefillin for the entire weekday Shacharit, Musaf, weekday Rosh Chodesh, and Chol HaMoed prayers; however, for the last several hundred years, almost all take off tefillin immediately after the Amidah of Shacharit on Chol HaMoed—some keep them until after the Torah reading on the day of Passover that "Shor or Kesev" is read, since this reading contains the commandment to wear tefillin—and immediately prior to Musaf on Rosh Chodesh. Many today, particularly in Israel, do not wear tefillin during Chol HaMoed.
- Separate blessings are said for the arm tefillin and the head tefillin.
- Barukh she’amar is recited before Hodu, unlike other customs that recite Hodu first.
- The second blessing before the Shema begins is Ahava Rabbah in the morning service and Ahavat Olam in the evening.
- In the summer months, the second blessing of the Amidah contains no reference to dew or rain. Sephardim insert the words morid ha-tal ("who makes the dew fall").
- The kedushah of Shacharit begins with "neqaddesh et shimcha", and the kedushah of Musaf (on Shabbat and Jewish holidays) starts with "na'aritz'cha ve-naqdish'cha".
- There is a single standard wording for Birkat Ha-Shanim of the Amidah, with only small variations between summer and winter.
- According to the original custom, the Priestly Blessing is recited only on festivals. In the Eastern Ashkenazic rite, it is generally recited only during the Musaf of festivals; in the Western Ashkenazic rite, it is recited during Shacharit and Musaf of festivals and during Ne’ila on Yom Kippur. In most Ashkenazic communities in Israel, the Priestly Blessing is recited daily.
- Barechenu, the substitute for the Priestly Blessing, is recited daily at Shacharit, whenever Musaf is recited, and during Minchah of Yom Kippur and fast days.
- The last blessing of the Amidah is Sim Shalom in the morning service and Shalom Rav in the afternoon and evening services. Congregations following German or Israeli Ashkenaz customs recite Sim Shalom during Shabbat Minchah because of the afternoon Torah reading.
- The Torah scroll is lifted and displayed to the congregation after the Torah reading rather than before.
- It is customary for the entire congregation to stand for Kaddish.
- Ein Keloheinu concludes with a stanza about making incense. It is recited only on Shabbat and holidays. Most communities in Israel recite it every day.
- Adon Olam has only five stanzas.
- The morning service on Shabbat and holidays contains Anim Zemirot. Many communities recite it after Musaf, although others recite it after Shacharit, right before taking out the Torah.
- Avoiding kitniyot during Passover is a binding custom.
- Blessings are said over all four cups of wine at the Passover Seder.
- Selichot do not begin until the night (or day) following the Shabbat immediately before Rosh Hashanah if Rosh Hashanah falls on Thursday or Shabbat, or a week-and-a-half before if Rosh Hashanah falls on Monday or Tuesday.
- Each household member lights one set of Hanukkah lights.
- The shammash is used to light the other Hanukkah lights.

== See also ==
- Jewish prayer modes
- Minhag
- Minhag Morocco
- Nusach
- Nusach Sefard
- Nusach Ari
- Sephardic law and customs
- Italian Nusach

== Bibliography ==
- Davidson, Charles, Immunim Benusaḥ Hatefillah (3 vols): Ashbourne Publishing 1996
- Ginzberg, Louis, Geonica: New York 1909
- Goldschmidt, Meḥqare Tefillah u-Fiyyut (On Jewish Liturgy): Jerusalem 1978
- Kalib, Sholom, The Musical Tradition of the Eastern European Synagogue (2 vols out of projected 5): Syracuse University Press 2001 (vol 1) and 2004 (vol 2)
- Reif, Stefan, Judaism and Hebrew Prayer: Cambridge 1993. Hardback ISBN 978-0-521-44087-5, ISBN 0-521-44087-4; Paperback ISBN 978-0-521-48341-4, ISBN 0-521-48341-7
- Reif, Stefan, Problems with Prayers: Berlin and New York 2006 ISBN 978-3-11-019091-5, ISBN 3-11-019091-5
- Wieder, Naphtali, The Formation of Jewish Liturgy: In the East and the West
- Zimmels, Hirsch Jakob, Ashkenazim and Sephardim: their Relations, Differences, and Problems As Reflected in the Rabbinical Responsa: London 1958 (since reprinted). ISBN 0-88125-491-6
