= Shema =

Jewish prayer

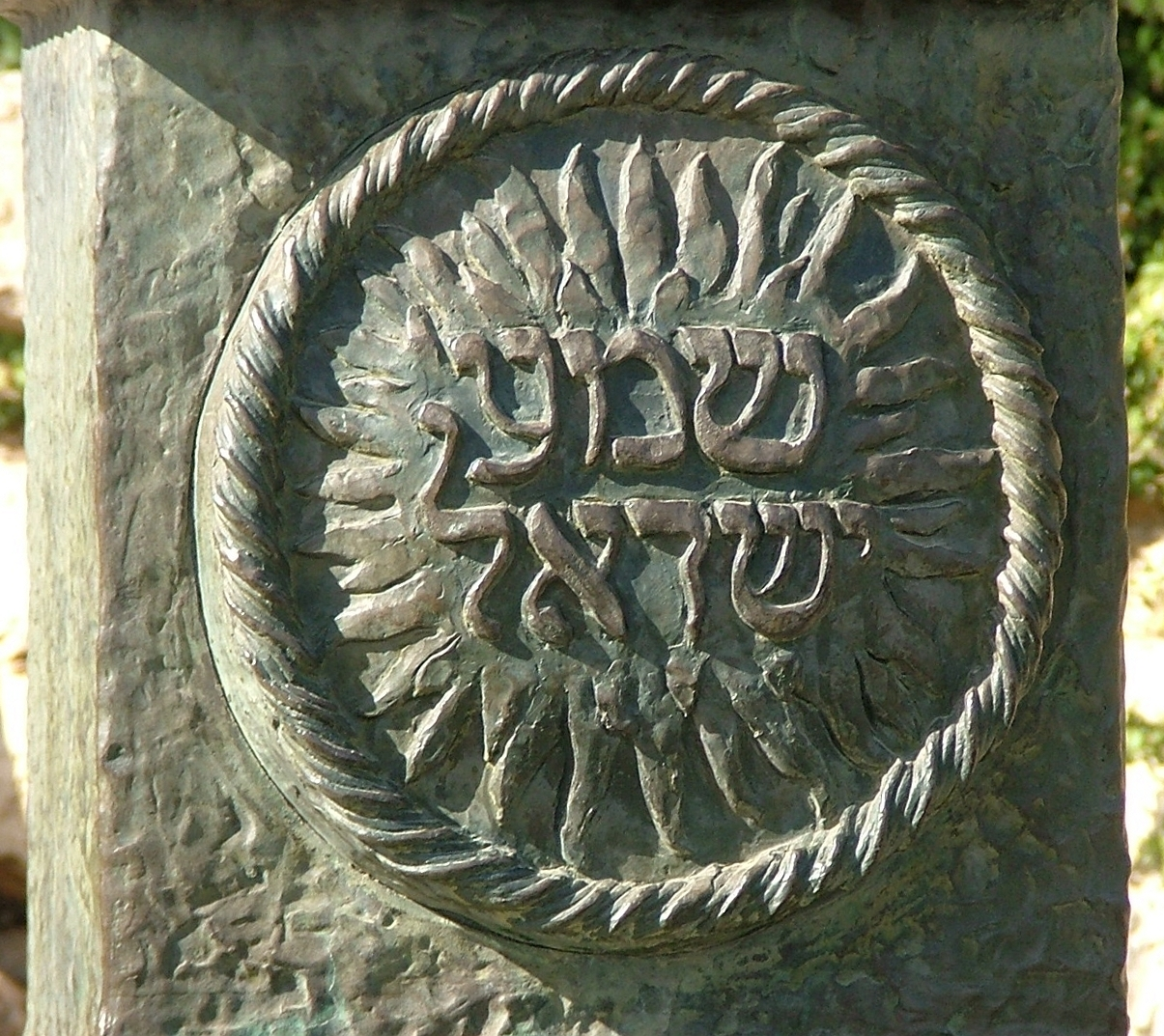
- Shema Yisrael at the Knesset Menorah in Jerusalem

Halakhic texts relating to this article
- Torah: Deut. 6:4–9, Deut. 11:13–21 and Num. 15:37–41
- Mishnah: Berakhot 1–3
- Babylonian Talmud: Berakhot
- Jerusalem Talmud: Berakhot
- Mishneh Torah: Mishneh Torah, Sefer Ahava 1–4
- Shulchan Aruch: Orach Chayim 58–88
- Other rabbinic codes: Kitzur Shulchan Aruch 17

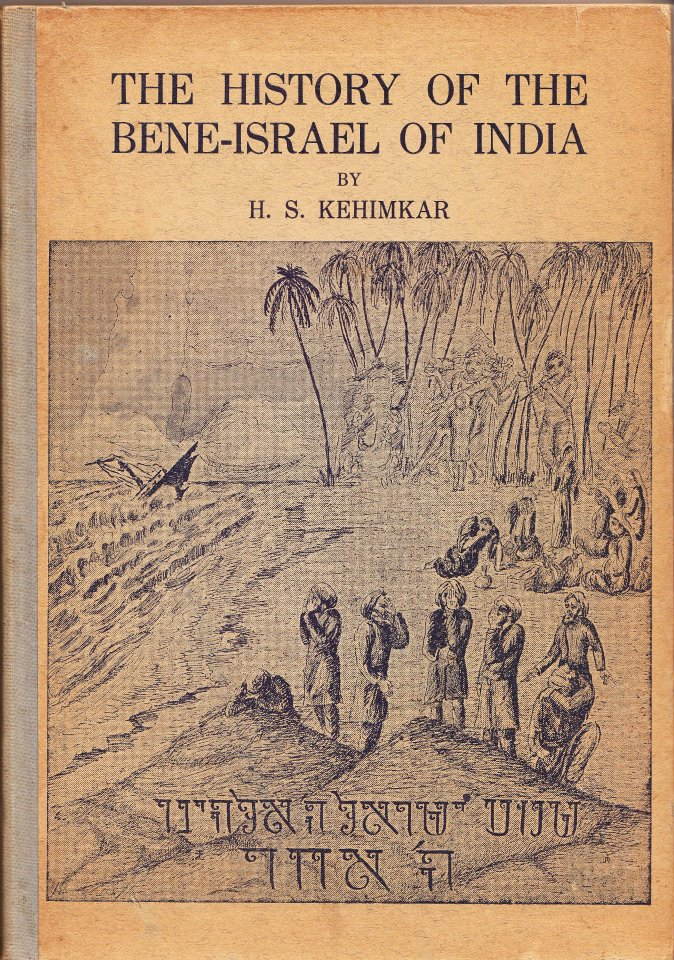
Indian Jews praying "Shema Yisrael", illustration on a book cover

Shema Yisrael (Shema Israel or Sh'ma Yisrael; Hebrew: שְׁמַע יִשְׂרָאֵל, romanized: Šĕmaʿ Yisraʾēl, lit. 'Hear, Israel') is a Jewish prayer (known as the Shema) that serves as a centerpiece of the morning and evening Jewish prayer services. Its first verse, Deuteronomy 6:4, encapsulates the monotheistic essence of Judaism: "Hear, O Israel: YHWH our God, YHWH is one" (שְׁמַע יִשְׂרָאֵל יְהוָה אֱלֹהֵינוּ יְהוָה אֶחָֽד׃).

The first part can be translated as either "The LORD our God" or "The LORD is our God", and the second part as either "the LORD is one" or as "the one LORD" (in the sense of "the LORD alone"). Hebrew does not generally use a copula in the present tense, so translators must decide by inference which translation is appropriate in English. The word used for "the LORD" is the Tetragrammaton (YHWH).

Observant Jews consider the Shema to be the most important part of the prayer service in Judaism, and its twice-daily recitation as a mitzvah (commandment by God to Jews). Furthermore, it is traditional for Jews to recite the Shema as their last words, in addition to reciting it before going to sleep at night.

The term Shema is used by extension to refer to the entirety of the portions of the morning and evening prayers that commence with Shema Yisrael and comprise Deuteronomy 6:4–9, Deuteronomy 11:13–21, and Numbers 15:37–41. These sections of the Torah are read in the weekly Torah portions Va'etchanan, Eikev, and Shlach, respectively.

== History ==
The recitation of the Shema in the liturgy consists of three portions: Deuteronomy 6:4–9, 11:13–21, and Numbers 15:37–41. The three portions are mentioned in the Mishnah (Berachot 2:2). The three portions relate to central issues of Jewish belief. In the Mishnah (Berakhot 2:5) the reciting of the shema was linked with re-affirming a personal relationship with God's rule. Literally, reciting the shema was stated as "receiving the kingdom of heaven." ["Heaven" is a metaphor for God. The best texts of the Mishnah, Kaufmann and Parma, do not have the addition "yoke" that is found in later printed Mishnahs: "receive the {yoke of the} kingdom of Heaven." The original statement appears to have been "to receive the kingdom of Heaven".]

Additionally, the Talmud points out that subtle references to the Ten Commandments can be found in the three portions. As the Ten Commandments were removed from daily prayer in the Mishnaic period (70–200 CE), the Shema is seen as an opportunity to commemorate the Ten Commandments.

There are two larger-print letters in the first sentence ('ayin ע and daleth ד) which, when combined, spell "עד". In Hebrew this means "witness". The idea thus conveyed is that through the recitation or proclamation of the Shema one is a living witness testifying to the truth of its message. Modern Kabbalistic schools, namely that of the Ari, teach that when one recites the last letter of the word eḥad (אחד), meaning "one", he is to intend that he is ready to "die into God".

== Content ==
=== Shema Yisrael ===
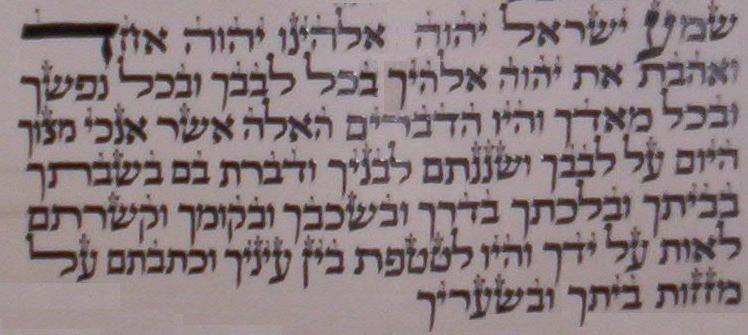
The first paragraph of the Shema seen in a Tefillin scroll

The first, pivotal words of the Shema are:

שְׁמַע יִשְׂרָאֵל יְהוָה אֱלֹהֵינוּ יְהוָה אֶחָד׃
Šəmaʿ Yīsrāʾēl YHWH ʾĕlōhēnū YHWH ʾeḥād:

Rabbinic Judaism teaches that the Tetragrammaton (י-ה-ו-ה), YHWH, is the ineffable and actual name of God, and as such is not read aloud in the Shema but is traditionally replaced with אדני, Adonai ("LORD"). For that reason, the Shema is recited aloud as Sh'ma Yisrael Adonai Eloheinu Adonai Eḥad ("Hear, O Israel: the LORD is our God, the LORD is One.")

The literal word meanings are roughly as follows:

Sh'ma: literally means listen, heed, or hear and do (according to the Targum, accept)
Yisrael: Israel, in the sense of the people or congregation of Israel
Adonai: often translated as "LORD", it is read in place of the YHWH written in the Hebrew text; Samaritans say Shema, which is Aramaic for "the [Divine] Name" and is the exact equivalent of the Hebrew ha-Shem, which Rabbinic Jews substitute for Adonai in a non-liturgical context such as everyday speech.
Eloheinu: the 1st person plural possessive of אֱלֹהִים Elohim, meaning "our God".
Echad: the unified and cardinal number One אֶחָד

This first verse of the Shema relates to the kingship of God. The first verse, "Hear, O Israel: the LORD our God is One LORD", has always been regarded as the confession of belief in the One God. Due to the ambiguity of the possible ways to translate the Hebrew passage, there are several possible renderings:

"Hear, O Israel! The Lord is our God! The Lord is One!", and
"Hear, O Israel! The Lord is our God – The Lord alone."

Many commentaries have been written about the subtle differences between the translations. There is an emphasis on the oneness of God and on the sole worship of God by Israel. There are other translations, though most retain one or the other emphases.

=== Baruch Shem ===
בָּרוּךְ שֵׁם כְּבוֹד מַלְכוּתוֹ לְעוֹלָם וָעֶד

Bārūḵ šēm kəvōd malḵūtō ləʿōlām vāʾed

"Blessed be the name of His glorious kingdom for ever and ever"

The second line is a rabbinic addition and is recited silently during congregational worship (except on Yom Kippur, when it is recited aloud). In Reform Judaism, it is recited aloud, but in a quieter voice than the rest of the prayer. It was originally a liturgical response in use in the Temple when the name of God was pronounced and took the form of Baruch shem k’vod l’olam, "Blessed be his glorious name forever" (Psalm 72:19). However, in time the words malchuto ("His kingdom") and va’ed ("for ever and ever") were added. Malchuto was introduced by the rabbis during Roman rule as a counter to the claim of divine honors by Roman emperors. Va’ed was introduced at the time of the Second Temple to contrast the view of the minim (heretics) that there is no life after death.

=== V'ahavta ===
The following verses are commonly referred to as the V'ahavta, reflecting the first word of the verse immediately following the Shema, or in Classical Hebrew V'ahav'ta, meaning "and you shall love...". These words contain the command to love God with all one's heart, soul, and might (Deuteronomy 6:5). The Talmud emphasizes that you will, at some point, whether you choose to or not, and therefore uses "shall" – obligatory – love God.

Then verse 7 goes on to remind the community to remember all the commandments and to "teach them diligently to your children and speak of them when you sit down and when you walk, when you lie down and when you rise", to recite the words of God when retiring or rising; to bind those words "on thy arm and thy head" (classically Jewish oral tradition interprets as tefillin), and to "inscribe them on the door-posts of your house and on your gates" (referring to mezuzah).

=== V'haya im shamoa ===
The passage following the Shema and V'ahavta relates to the issue of reward and punishment. It contains the promise of reward for serving God with all one's heart, soul, and might (Deut 11:13) and for the fulfillment of the laws. It also contains punishment for transgression, largely relating to harvest resources and being expelled from the land of Israel. It also contains a repetition of the contents of the first portion – but this time spoken to the second person plural, whereas the first portion is directed to the individual, this time it is directed to the whole community.

=== Vayomer ===
The third portion relates to the issue of redemption. Specifically, it contains the law concerning the tzitzit (Numbers 15:37–41) as a reminder that all laws of God are obeyed, as a warning against following evil inclinations and in remembrance of the exodus from Egypt. For the prophets and rabbis, the exodus from Egypt is paradigmatic of Jewish faith that God redeems from all forms of foreign domination. It can be found in the portion Shlach-Lecha in the Book of Numbers.

=== Summary ===
In summary, the content flows from the assertion of the oneness of God's kingship. Thus, in the first portion, there is a command to love God with all one's heart, soul, and might, and to remember and teach these very important words to the children throughout the day. Obeying these commands, says the second portion, will lead to rewards, and disobeying them will lead to punishment. The Shema reminds the Jewish people to be true to their covenant as failing to do so will lead to their expulsion from their land. To ensure fulfillment of these key commands, God also commands in the third portion a practical reminder, wearing the tzitzit, "that ye may remember and do all my commandments, and be holy unto your God."

The second line quoted, "Blessed be the Name of His glorious kingdom for ever and ever", was originally a congregational response to the declaration of the Oneness of God; it is therefore often printed in small font and recited in an undertone, as recognition that it is not, itself, a part of the cited biblical verses. The third section of the Shema ends with Numbers 15:41, but traditional Jews end the recitation of the Shema by reciting the first word of the following blessing, Emet, or "Truth" without interruption.

== Jewish women and the Shema ==
In Orthodox Judaism, women are not required to daily recite the Shema (as a command from the Torah), as with other time-bound requirements which might impinge on their traditional familial obligations, although they are obligated to pray at least once daily without a specific liturgy requirement.

Conservative Judaism generally regards Jewish women as being obligated to recite the Shema at the same times as men.

Reform and Reconstructionist Judaism do not regard gender-related traditional Jewish ritual requirements as necessary in modern circumstances, including obligations for men, but not women, to pray specific prayers at specific times. Instead, both sexes may fulfill all requirements.

== Accompanying blessings ==
The blessings preceding and following the Shema are traditionally credited to the members of the Great Assembly. They were first instituted in the liturgy of the Temple in Jerusalem.

According to the Talmud, the reading of the Shema morning and evening fulfills the commandment "You shall meditate therein day and night". As soon as a child begins to speak, his father is directed to teach him the verse "Moses commanded us a law, even the inheritance of the congregation of Jacob", and teach him to read the Shema. The reciting of the first verse of the Shema is called "the acceptance of the yoke of the kingship of God" (kabalat ol malchut shamayim). Judah ha-Nasi, who spent all day involved with his studies and teaching, said just the first verse of the Shema in the morning "as he passed his hands over his eyes", which appears to be the origin of the custom to cover the eyes with the right hand while reciting the first verse.

The first verse of the Shema is recited aloud, simultaneously by the hazzan and the congregation, which responds with the rabbinically instituted Baruch Shem ("Blessed be the Name") in silence before continuing the rest of Shema. Only on Yom Kippur is this response said aloud. The remainder of the Shema is read in silence. Many Sephardim recite the whole of the Shema aloud, except the Baruch Shem, as well as the verse "And God will be angry at you" which many recite silently. Reform Jews also recite the whole of the first paragraph of the Shema aloud.

=== Blessings ===
During Shacharit, two blessings are recited before the Shema and one after the Shema. There is a question in Jewish law as to whether these blessings are on the Shema, or surrounding the Shema. The conclusion that has been drawn is that they are surrounding the Shema, because the structure is similar to that of blessings of the Torah, and there is doubt as to whether such blessings would actually enhance the Shema. The two blessings that are recited before the Shema are Yotzer ohr and Ahava Rabbah/Ahavat Olam. The blessing after is known as Emet Vayatziv.

During Maariv, there are two blessings before the Shema and two after. The two before are HaMaariv Aravim and Ahavat Olam. The two after are Emet V'Emunah and Hashkiveinu. Some communities add Baruch Hashem L'Olam on weekdays.

Overall, the three blessings in the morning and four in the evening which accompany the Shema sum to seven, in accordance with the verse in Psalms: "I praise You seven times each day for Your just rules."

== Bedtime Shema ==
Before going to sleep, Jews traditionally recite the first paragraph of the Shema. The practice is not only a biblical commandment (given in Deuteronomy 6:6–7) but also alluded to in Psalm 4:4: "Commune with your own heart upon your bed".

Some also have the custom of reading all three paragraphs, along with a list of sections from the Psalms, Vidui, and others. Altogether, the liturgy is known as the K'riat Shema al ha-mitah (קריאת שמע על המיטה, 'reading the Shema on the bed'; Ashkenazi pronunciation: K'rias Shema al ha-mitah). According to Isaac Luria and the Tanya, reading the prayer with deep concentration also effectively cleans one from sin.

According to Rashi, one fulfills their biblical obligation of the saying Shema in this prayer and not by the Shema recited during Maariv, being that minyanim often pray Maariv before nightfall (i.e., before the time of the obligation).

=== Source of the prayer ===
In tractate Berakhot 4b, the Rabbis conclude that, "Even though one has recited the Shema prayer in the synagogue, it is obligatory to recite it on [one's] bed." Later, in Berakhot 60b, they decide: "One who goes to sleep on [their] bed says Shema Yisrael until Vehaya Im Shamoa and then says the blessing of Ha-mapil.

=== Additions to the prayer ===
The Talmud, in Shevu'ot 15b, mentions Yehoshua ben Levi's custom of reciting Psalm 91 and Psalm 3 (excluding the first verse) as a means of protection against demons while sleeping.

Additional psalms, biblical portions, and prayers were incorporated over time; customs differ. Although adding Psalms is not mandatory, it is generally anticipated.

The Rishonim argued whether one is to say the portion of "Vehaya Im Shamoa" and those who say one should also recite the third portion of Shema.

According to various customs, which are founded on the Arizal, the prayer also includes the tachanun to confess and clean the sins of the past day. Some customs include Psalm 91, 51, and 121. Additionally, some add the lyrics of the piyyut 'Ana BeKoach' and Psalm 67.

Another common addition is "In the name of the LORD God of Israel, at my right be Michael, and at my left be Gabriel, and before me Uriel, and behind me Raphael, and on my head the Presence of the LORD". Although close variants are known from the Geonic period, a version of the prayer very similar to the one recited today appears in the Machzor Vitry, before finding its way into the Zohar and modern prayerbooks.

== Other instances ==
The exhortation by the Kohen in calling Israel to arms against an enemy (which does not apply when the Temple in Jerusalem is not standing) also includes Shema Yisrael.

According to the Talmud, Rabbi Akiva patiently endured while his flesh was being torn with iron combs, and died reciting the Shema. He pronounced the last word of the sentence, Eḥad ("one") with his last breath. Since then, it has been traditional for Jews to say the Shema as their last words. In 2006 Roi Klein, a major in the Israel Defense Forces, said the Shema before jumping on a live grenade and dying to save his fellow soldiers.

=== Other religious literature ===
Reformulations of the Shema appear in later Jewish Scripture, Second Temple literature, and New Testament texts. In these texts, sometimes new features are added to the Shema (e.g. 2 Kings 19:19; Zech. 14:9), in others, it is abbreviated to “God is One” (Philo, Spec. 1.30), “one God” (Josephus, C. Ap. 2.193), or “God alone” (2 Maccabees 7:37). The following is a selection of significant occurrences.

In later Jewish scripture:

- 2 Kings 19:19: "And now, O Lord our God, please deliver us from his hand, so that all the kingdoms of the earth may know that You are the Lord God alone."
- Zechariah 14:9: "And the Lord shall become King over all the earth; on that day shall the Lord be one, and His name one."
- Malachi 2:10: "Have we not all one father? Has not one God created us? Why should we betray, each one his brother, to profane the covenant of our forefathers?"

In Second Temple literature:

- Letter of Aristeas 132: "But first of all he taught that God is one, and that his power is made manifest in all things, and that every place is filled with his sovereignty, and that nothing done by men on earth secretly escapes his notice, but that all that anyone does and all that is to be is manifest to him."
- 2 Maccabees 7:37–38: "I, like my brothers, give up body and life for the laws of our fathers, appealing to God to show mercy soon to our nation and by afflictions and plagues to make you confess that he alone is God, and through me and my brothers to bring to an end the wrath of the Almighty which has justly fallen on our whole nation."
- Philo, On Special Laws 1.30: "This lesson he continually repeats, sometimes saying that God is one and the Framer and Maker of all things, sometimes that He is Lord of created beings, because stability and fixity and lordship are by nature vested in Him alone."
- Josephus, Antiquities of the Jews 4.199: "And let there be neither an altar nor a temple in any other city; for God is but one, and the nation of the Hebrews is but one."
- Josephus, Against Apion 2.193: "There ought also to be but one temple for one God; for likeness is the constant foundation of agreement. This temple ought to be common to all men, because he is the common God of all men."

In the New Testament:

- Mark 12:28–29 (NASB): One of the scribes came and heard them arguing, and recognizing that He had answered them well, asked Him, "What commandment is the foremost of all?" Jesus answered, "The foremost is, 'Hear, O Israel! The Lord our God is one Lord.'"
- Romans 3:29–30 (NASB): "Or is God the God of Jews only? Is He not the God of Gentiles also? Yes, of Gentiles also, since indeed God who will justify the circumcised by faith and the uncircumcised through faith is one."
- James 2:19 (NASB): "You believe that God is one. You do well; the demons also believe, and shudder."

=== Music and film ===
- Arnold Schoenberg used it as part of the story to his narrative orchestral work A Survivor from Warsaw (1947).
- In Parade, a musical based on true events, the main character Leo Frank, wrongly accused of the murder of a child worker at the pencil factory he manages, recites the Shema Yisrael as a vigilante gang kidnap and hang him in the final scenes of the work.
- Pop versions have been published by Mordechai ben David and Sarit Hadad.
- In Pi, Max Cohen and Lenny Meyer can be seen reciting the first three verses of the Shema.
- In The Shoes of the Fisherman, Anthony Quinn, as the fictional Pope Kiril, explores the back streets of Rome disguised as a simple priest, and recites the Shema at the bedside of a dying Roman Jew.
- Reggae singer Matisyahu recites the Shema in his songs "Got No water" and "Tel Aviv'n".
- Yaakov Shwekey, in his "Shema Yisrael", used the story of Rabbi Eliezer Silver's saving Jewish children hidden in Christian monasteries following the Holocaust by reciting the first line of the Shema.
- Singer Justin Bieber says the Shema before each public performance with his manager Scooter Braun, who is Jewish.
- Italian parody band Nanowar of Steel paraphrased it as "Shema Yggdrasil" in their 2019 single "Valhallelujah."

=== Television ===
In episode 14 of season 1 of the television series The Pitt, Dr. Robby recites the Shema in order to comfort himself during a difficult moment in the ER. He tells Whittaker that he used to recite it with his grandmother as a child.

In episode 9 of season 3 of the television series The Man in the High Castle, the character Frank Frink recites the Shema just before he is executed.

In the Northern Exposure episode "Kaddish for Uncle Manny", Joel Fleischman doubts the sincerity of a burly itinerant lumberjack who arrives in response to Maurice Minnifield's offer of free food and lodging to participate in a minyan; he asks the man to recite the Shema, which he does. In the episode "The Body in Question", Joel Fleischman recites the first verse of the Shema while sick in bed after falling asleep in a freezer, where he had a dream he spoke with the prophet Elijah at his great-grandfather's Passover Seder in Poland.

In episode 4 of season 2 of the television series Shtisel (2015), Rebetzen Erblich asks her friend Bube Malka to recite the Shema with her as she is preparing to die.

In episode 6 of season 1 of the television series The Sandman, Death comes for an old Jewish man, Harry who recites the Shema before dying.

In episode 10 of season 5 of the television series Snowfall, Avi Drexler sings the Shema after he has been shot in the stomach by a KGB officer, likely intended as his last words.

== Divine unity of the Shema in Hasidic philosophy ==
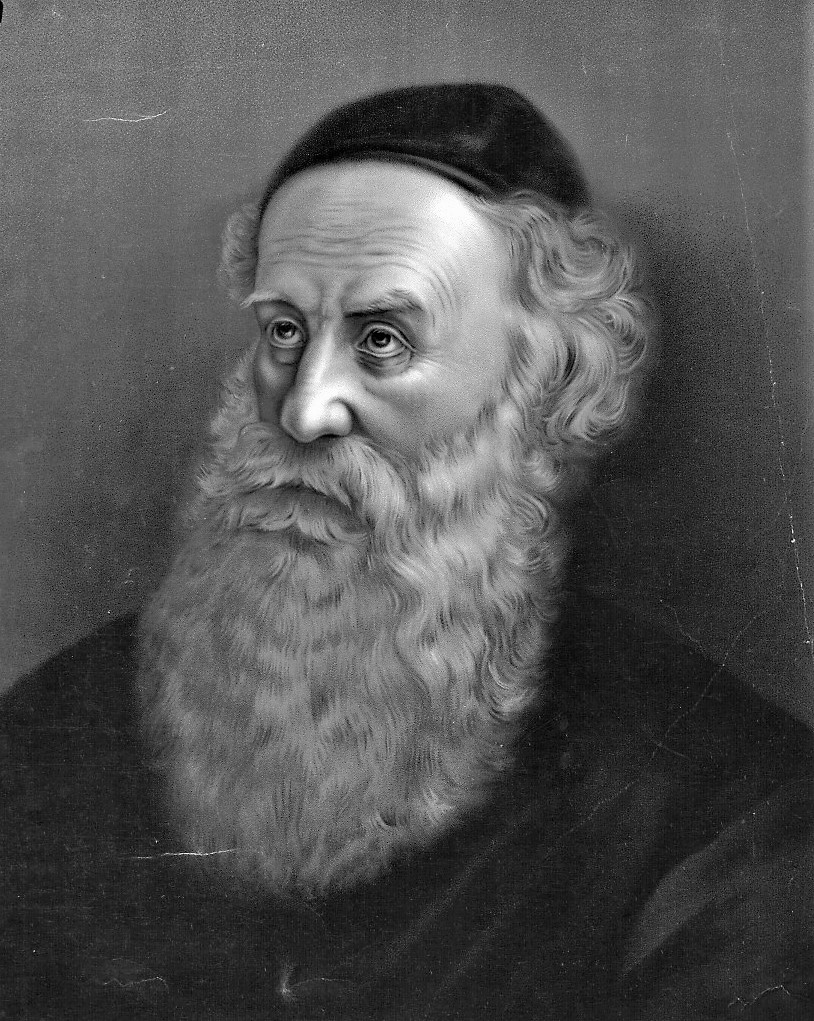
Schneur Zalman of Liadi articulated Divine Unity in Hasidic philosophy.

The second section of the Tanya brings the mystical panentheism of the founder of Hasidic Judaism, the Baal Shem Tov, into philosophical explanation. It outlines the Hasidic interpretation of God's Unity in the first two lines of the Shema, based upon their interpretation in Kabbalah. The emphasis on Divine Omnipresence and immanence lies behind Hasidic joy and devekut, and its stress on transforming the material into spiritual worship. In this internalisation of Kabbalistic ideas, the Hasidic follower seeks to reveal the Unity and hidden holiness in all activities of life.

Medieval, rationalist Jewish philosophers (exponents of Hakirah–rational "investigation" from first principles in support of Judaism), such as Maimonides, describe Biblical monotheism to mean that there is only one God, and his essence is a unique, simple, infinite Unity. Jewish mysticism provides a philosophic paradox, by dividing God's Unity into God's essence and emanation.

In Kabbalah and especially Hasidism, God's Unity means that there is nothing independent of his essence. The new doctrine in Lurianic Kabbalah of God's tzimtzum ("withdrawal") received different interpretations after Isaac Luria, from the literal to the metaphorical. To Hasidism and Schneur Zalman, it is unthinkable for the "withdrawal" of God that "makes possible" Creation, to be taken literally. The paradox of Tzimtzum only relates to the Ohr Ein Sof ("Infinite Light"), not the Ein Sof (Divine essence) itself. God's infinity is revealed in both complementary infinitude (infinite light) and finitude (finite light). The "withdrawal" was only a concealment of the Infinite Light into the essence of God, to allow the latent potentially finite light to emerge after the God limiting tzimtzum. God himself remains unaffected ("For I, the Lord, I have not changed" Malachi 3:6). His essence was One, alone, before Creation, and still One, alone, after Creation, without any change. As the tzimtzum only limits God to a concealment, therefore God's Unity remains Omnipresent. In the Baal Shem Tov's interpretation, Divine providence affects every detail of Creation. The "movement of a leaf in the wind" is part of the unfolding Divine presence, and is a necessary part of the complete Tikkun (Rectification in Kabbalah). This awareness of the loving Divine purpose and significance of each individual and his free will, awakens mystical love and awe of God.

Schneur Zalman explains that God's divided Unity has two levels, an unlimited level and a limited one, that are both paradoxically true. The main text of medieval Kabbalah, the Zohar, describes the first verse of the Shema ("Hear O Israel, the Lord is God, the Lord is One") as the "Upper level Unity", and the second line ("Blessed be the Name of the Glory of His Kingdom forever") as the limited "Lower level Unity". Schneur Zalman gives the Chabad explanation of this. In his Kabbalah philosophy, all Creation is dependent on the limited, immanent, potentially finite, "Light that Fills all Worlds", that each Creation receives continually. All is bittul–nullified to the light, even though in our realm this complete dependence is hidden. From this perspective, of God knowing the Creation on its own terms, Creation exists, but the true essence of anything is only the Divine spark that continuously recreates it from nothing. God is One, as nothing has any independent existence without this continual flow of Divine Will to Create. This is the pantheistic Lower Level Unity.

In relation to God's essence, Creation affects no change or withdrawal. All Creation takes place "within" God. "There is nothing but God". The ability to create can only come from the infinite Divine essence, represented by the Tetragrammaton name of God. However, "It is not the essence of the Divine, to create Worlds and sustain them", as this ability is only external to the Infinite essence "outside" God. Creation only derives from God's revelatory anthropomorphic "speech" (as in Genesis 1), and even this is unlike the external speech of Man, as it too remains "within" God. From this upper perspective of God knowing himself on his own terms, the created existence of Creation does not exist, as it is as nothing in relation to Zalman's philosophically constructed concept of God's essence. This monistic acosmism is the "Upper Level Unity", as from this perspective, only God exists.

== In other religions ==
=== In Islam ===
The words used in the Shema prayer are similar to the words of verse 1 of Sura 112 (Al-Tawhid or Monotheism) in the Quran: Arabic: قُلْ هُوَ اللَّهُ أَحَدٌ, qul huwa llāhu ʾaḥad ("Say, He is God the One"). The word أَحَدٌ, aḥad, in Arabic is a cognate of the word אֶחָד, eḥad, in Hebrew.

=== In Christianity ===
The Shema is one of the Old Testament sentences quoted in the New Testament. The Gospel of Mark 12:29–31 mentions that Jesus of Nazareth considered the opening exhortation of the Shema to be the first of his two greatest commandments and linked with a second (based on Leviticus 19:18b): "The first of all the commandments is, Hear, O Israel; The Lord our God is one Lord: And thou shalt love the Lord thy God with all thy heart, and with all thy soul, and with all thy mind, and with all thy strength: this is the first commandment. And the second is like, namely this, Thou shalt love thy neighbor as thyself." In Luke 10:25–27 the Shema is also linked with Leviticus 19:18. The verses Deuteronomy 6:5 and Leviticus 19:18b both begin with ve'ahavta, "and you shall love". In Luke's Gospel, it appears that this connection between the two verses was already part of cultural discussion or practice.

Theologians Carl Friedrich Keil and Franz Delitzsch noted that "the heart is mentioned first (in Deuteronomy 6:5), as the seat of the emotions generally and of love in particular; then follows the soul (nephesh) as the centre of personality in man, to depict the love as pervading the entire self-consciousness; and to this is added, "with all the strength", i.e. of body and soul.

The Shema has also been incorporated into Christian liturgy, and is discussed in terms of the Trinity. In the Latin Catholic Liturgy of the Hours, the Shema is read during the Night Prayer or Compline every Saturday, thereby concluding the day's prayers. The Anglican Book of Common Prayer in use in Canada since 1962 has included the Shema in its Summary of the Law. Since 2012, when the Anglican Use version of the BCP, the Book of Divine Worship, was adapted for use in Canada, it has been recited by Roman Catholics as well. It has been incorporated into Divine Worship: The Missal, transposed as the "Summary of the Law" in Mt 22:37–40 and is recited either by the Priest or the Deacon.

The Anglican (and Orthodox Celtic) Church officially utilizes the Shema in the Daily Services. Namely with the decalogue.

== See also ==
- Al-Ikhlas
- Modalistic Monarchianism
- Mool Mantar
- Nicene Creed
- Profession (religious)
- Tawhid
- Shahada
- Unitarianism
