= Ahava rabbah =

Jewish morning prayer

Ahava rabbah (Hebrew: אהבה רבה, [with an] abundant love, also Ahavah raba and other variant English spellings) is the name given in Ashkenazi Jewish custom to the blessing recited immediately before the Shema as part of the Shacharit (morning) prayer. The name is taken from the first words of the prayer.

In Sephardi custom and for many of those whose follow Nusach Sefard, the text of the same blessing differs slightly, and the blessing's name and initial words are "Ahavat Olam" (not to be confused with the shorter blessing of Ahavat Olam recited by both Sefardim and Ashkenazim during Maariv).

Some claim that text of this prayer was fixed in the period of the Geonim.

In the Jerusalem Talmud this blessing is referred to by the name birkat torah.

== Content ==
This prayer is an expression of thanks for the love God has given the people. It thanks God for the gift of the Torah, which provides life, and for making the Jewish people the chosen nation.

The prayer contains multiple requests to God. One of them is to be enlightened with the Torah. Another is for God to protect us from shame; it is stated that those who cleave to a life of mitzvot will not be shamed. Another is that the Jewish people be gathered from the four corners of the world and returned to Israel.

The text according to Nusach Ashkenaz is:

אַהֲבָה רַבָּה אֲהַבְתָּנוּ, ה’ אֱלהֵינוּ. חֶמְלָה גְּדולָה וִיתֵרָה חָמַלְתָּ עָלֵינוּ: אָבִינוּ מַלְכֵּנוּ. בַּעֲבוּר אֲבותֵינוּ שֶׁבָּטְחוּ בְךָ. וַתְּלַמְּדֵם חֻקֵּי חַיִּים כֵּן תְּחָנֵּנוּ וּתְלַמְּדֵנוּ: אָבִינוּ הָאָב הָרַחֲמָן. הַמְרַחֵם. רַחֵם עָלֵינוּ. וְתֵן בְּלִבֵּנוּ לְהָבִין וּלְהַשכִּיל. לִשְׁמעַ. לִלְמד וּלְלַמֵּד. לִשְׁמר וְלַעֲשות וּלְקַיֵּם אֶת כָּל דִּבְרֵי תַלְמוּד תּורָתֶךָ בְּאַהֲבָה: וְהָאֵר עֵינֵינוּ בְּתורָתֶךָ. וְדַבֵּק לִבֵּנוּ בְּמִצְותֶיךָ. וְיַחֵד לְבָבֵנוּ לְאַהֲבָה וּלְיִרְאָה אֶת שְׁמֶךָ. וְלא נֵבושׁ לְעולָם וָעֶד: כִּי בְשֵׁם קָדְשְׁךָ הַגָּדול וְהַנּורָא בָּטָחְנוּ. נָגִילָה וְנִשמְחָה בִּישׁוּעָתֶךָ: וַהֲבִיאֵנוּ לְשָׁלום מֵאַרְבַּע כַּנְפות הָאָרֶץ. וְתולִיכֵנוּ קומְמִיּוּת לְאַרְצֵנוּ: כִּי אֵל פּועֵל יְשׁוּעות אָתָּה. וּבָנוּ בָחַרְתָּ מִכָּל עַם וְלָשׁון. וְקֵרַבְתָּנוּ לְשִׁמְךָ הַגָּדול סֶלָה בֶּאֱמֶת: לְהודות לְךָ וּלְיַחֶדְךָ בְּאַהֲבָה: בָּרוּךְ אַתָּה ה’, הַבּוחֵר בְּעַמּו יִשרָאֵל בְּאַהֲב

Translation:

[With] a great love have You loved us, Lord, our God; [with] a great and superabundant compassion have You had compassion upon us. Our Parent our Sovereign – for the sake of our fathers who trusted in You and You taught them the laws of life; so [too] grace us and teach us. Our Father, merciful Father, the merciful One – have mercy upon us, and put into our hearts to understand and to comprehend and to listen and to study and to teach and to keep and to do and to preserve all of the words of the study of Your Torah with love. And enlighten our eyes in Your Torah, and make our heart cling to Your commandments, and unite our hearts to love and fear Your name; and may we never be embarrassed ever. Since we have trusted in Your great and awesome holy Name, let us rejoice and be gladdened by Your salvation. And bring us in peace from the four corners of the Earth, and lead us erectly to our Land; as You are God who performs salvations. And You have chosen us with all nations and languages, and have brought us close to Your great name forever in truth, to praise You and unify You with love. Blessed are You, Lord, who chooses His people, Israel, with love.

== Practices and laws ==
In Nusach Ashkenaz, Ahava rabbah is recited during Shacharit, and Ahavat Olam during Maariv. The Talmud provides differing views on which one should be recited. As a compromise, Ahava Rabbah (being the longer of the two) is recited in the morning, and Ahavat Olam in the evening. In the Sephardic rite, as well and many Nusach Sefard communities, Ahavat Olam is recited in both the morning and the evening.

In many communities, during Ahava rabbah, at the words "Bring us in peace from the four corners of the earth [to our land]", the four corners of the tzitzit are gathered in one's hand. They are held throughout the Shema and kissed four times during the third paragraph of the Shema and once during Emet Veyatziv (the paragraph following the Shema) and then released. The gathering of the tzitzit on these words is symbolic of the gathering of the Jewish people to its land.

Ahava rabbah is recited immediately before the Shema because its recital brings on the obligation to immediately learn, or at the very least, recite verses from the Torah. Since the Shema is composed of verses from the Torah, its recital fulfills that obligation.

The recitation of Ahava Rabbah fulfills the mitzvah of saying a blessing before Torah study. Normally, verses from the Torah are recited during Birkat HaShachar. But if one forgets to recite these verses then, the obligation is met through the recitation of Ahava Rabbah. However, the recitation of the Shema does not meet the requirement for learning after reciting the blessing on Torah study, even though it is composed of verses from the Torah, and one must learn something immediately following prayers in order for Ahava Rabbah to work in this capacity.

In Nusach Ashkenaz, a special piyyut (called an ahavah) is inserted before the conclusion of this blessing on special sabbaths. Most notable are the ahavah piyyutim recited in the Eastern Ashkenazic rite on the sabbaths between Passover and Shavuot - these poems include a dialogue between the Jewish people and God, where the Jewish people complain that the persecution has become so difficult and ask for redemption and God comforts them.
