= Emet Veyatziv =

Jewish morning prayer

Emet Veyatziv (Hebrew: אמת ויציב, lit. 'true and certain') is a blessing recited by Jews during Shacharit, the daily morning prayer. It immediately follows the Shema and precedes the Amidah.

== Themes ==
It is a recognition of God's kingship and God as the One and only, and thankfulness to God for the exodus from Egypt, the slaying of the firstborn, the splitting of the sea, and the redemption of Israel from exile.

The word Emet ("truth") is repeated several times in entire blessing, as the first word of a sentence or paragraph. For this reason, Orchos Chaim views the blessing as a review of the Shema.

== Structure ==
The first word of the blessing is אמת (emet). However, when recited communally, this word is appended to the end of the Shema. Upon finishing the Shema and saying the word emet, one waits for the chazzan to reach this point before continuing with veyatziv and the remainder of the blessing. This is because halacha prohibits interrupting between the Shema and this blessing, in order that the phrase אדני אלהיכם אמת (The Lord your God is true), whose first two Hebrew words come from the Shema and whose last word from this blessing, be recited. This practice is already mentioned in the Mishnah (Tamid 5:1).

The structure that appears in most siddurim is as follows:

1. Emet Veyatziv is the first paragraph. The word emet (truth) is appended onto the Shema, and veyatziv appears as the first word. In the Western Ashkenazic rite, when a Zulat is recited, a shorter form of this prayer is recited instead of the regular form.
2. Al Harishonim is the second paragraph. It focuses on the truth of redemption. In both the Eastern and Western Ashkenazic rites, when a Zulat is recited, a special form of this prayer is recited instead of the regular form.
3. Ezrat Avoteinu is the third paragraph, and is an elaboration on the Exodus from Egypt
4. The blessing ends with the paragraph Mi Komokha, ending with the blessing Ga'al Yisrael (Who Redeemed Israel)

== Obligation to recite ==
The obligation to recite Emet Veyatziv appears in Brachos 12a. Here, it is stated that whoever does not recite this paragraph has not fulfilled one's obligation "To proclaim your kindness in the morning, and your faithfulness at night," (Psalms 92:3), and therefore his obligation to recite Shema.

=== Recitation by women ===
While it is questionable, according to halakha, whether women are required or even allowed to recite the blessings accompanying the Shema, many authorities hold that women are obligated to recite Emet Veyatziv, since doing so fulfills the mitzvah of remembering the exodus from Egypt, which is not a time-bound commandment.

== See also ==
- Emet VeEmunah, the blessing recited after the Shema at night
