= Testimony in Jewish law =

Testimony in Jewish law consists of testimony by eligible witnesses to a Beit Din (court) authorized to render decisions according to halakhah (Jewish law). Eligible witnesses must in almost all cases be free men who are not deaf, mentally or morally unsuitable, or too young for Bar Mitzvah; in particular, women are in most cases not eligible. The principles of testimony in halakhah have been applied to Mishpat Ivri (Hebrew jurisprudence).

== Criteria for valid testimony ==
A valid witness to an event in halakhah must have seen the event with his eyes or heard it with his ears. Generally hearsay from another person is inadmissible, except in rare cases such as confirming that a missing husband has died (see Agunah). A Beit Din may accept testimony only from a witness who speaks directly to the judges, not from a written deposition. A witness may not recant his testimony.

=== Two witnesses ===
The Torah says (Deuteronomy 19:15): "One witness shall not arise against a man for any sin or guilt that he may commit; according to two witnesses or according to three witnesses a matter shall stand." Thus, two witnesses provide conclusive proof of reality, but one witness does not. (However, the testimony of one witness can require a defendant to swear to his innocence or else pay the debt alleged against him.)

In monetary law two witnesses may absolutely require someone to pay a debt or absolve them from that obligation. In capital cases two witnesses may testify that a person has committed a crime punishable by the death penalty in Jewish law, and the Sanhedrin may execute the person on their word; however capital punishment is no longer applied.

The testimony of two witnesses is equal in its force to the testimony of three or more witnesses. Thus if two witnesses say an event occurred, and one hundred witnesses say it did not occur, the groups of witnesses are considered to contradict one another, but no more weight is given to the larger group; other evidence is needed to reach a judgment. If one of the witnesses is disqualified, his entire group is disqualified, even if the other witnesses are themselves qualified and could present a valid testimony without his assistance. (Source: Makkot chapter 1.)

In monetary law examination of witnesses is less stringent than in capital law, and testimony is accepted even despite minor contradictions that may exist in the testimony of two separate witnesses. (If one witness says a defendant owes 100, and the other says the sum is 200, the judges accept that both witnesses agree to the existence of a 100 lien, even though only one witness testifies to each individual lien. Similarly, if one witness says a defendant owes 100 based on a loan granted on Monday, and another witness says the debt is 100 based on a loan granted on Thursday, the defendant is considered to owe 100 by the combined testimony of the two witnesses even though they disagree as to the source of the obligation.) In contrast, in capital cases the judges threaten the witnesses by warning of the consequences of perjury (source: Mishnah Sanhedrin chapter 4), and they ask many questions and will invalidate testimony even for minor inconsistencies, even if the contradiction seems substantively irrelevant to the case at hand. The purpose of these stringencies is to prevent the killing of an innocent defendant.

=== Ceremonial versus evidentiary witnesses ===
In some instances two witnesses are required to perform a certain action, such as kiddushin (betrothal). If there are not two valid witnesses, the kiddushin does not take effect. These are ceremonial witnesses (Hebrew: eidei kiyum). Likewise, a shtar requires two witnesses, and in particular a get requires two witnesses to sign the document or see the delivery.

Witnesses in monetary cases are evidentiary: even if they do not witness a robbery, the robber is still obligated to compensate the owner for damages. Evidentiary witnesses are known in Hebrew as eidei beirur.

== Invalidation of a pair of witnesses ==
A pair of witnesses may be invalidated if:

- Two other witnesses directly contradict their testimony. (In Hebrew, this is hakchasha, הכחשה.)
- Two other witnesses testify that at the moment the original witnesses claim they saw the incident, those witnesses were with them and could not have witnessed an event elsewhere. The second pair of witnesses knows nothing about the substance of the matter, but rather undermines the standing of the first pair of witnesses to claim they saw the incident. This undermining is called hazama, הזמה. Witnesses found to have lied under this provision are punished with whatever punishment would have befallen their intended victim. Thus, if they plotted to make a victim suffer capital punishment, the witnesses themselves must suffer capital punishment.
- Blood relatives are not allowed to be witnesses or judges in the same case (Sanhedrin chapter 3 lists which blood relatives are included). This is a fundamental exclusion, without regard to the specific nature of a possible conflict of interest in a particular case.
- Any witness who is established by other witnesses as a liar or robber or other miscreant is invalid. There is a general rule that if one person among a group of witnesses is disqualified, they are all disqualified, even if the original disqualification does not question the truthfulness of the disqualified witness, and even if there remain two other witnesses (Makkot chapter 1).

=== Powers of a lone witness ===
A lone witness cannot give testimony in capital cases. His testimony is useless unless there is a second witness to join him. In monetary cases a lone witness has limited powers. He can require a defendant to take an oath stating that the defendant is in the right, and if the defendant refuses to take the oath he must pay instead. (In most cases, it is at the defendant's discretion whether to swear but, in rare instances, the court may require the defendant to pay without the option of swearing [Shevu'ot chapter 7].)

In the case of a classical Agunah, a woman whose husband has disappeared and it is not known whether the husband is still alive, a single witness (even a woman or slave, normally invalid as witnesses) may testify that the husband has died, and on that basis the woman may remarry.

== Ineligible witnesses ==
Testimony of a deaf, mentally incompetent or young person (before Bar Mitzvah) is excluded. Testimony from women is also generally excluded. Anyone who is caught guilty of a sin which demonstrates greed, i.e. who sins in order to acquire money, is also disqualified.

Tractate Sanhedrin lists other categories of witnesses who are disqualified.

The Talmud, in the third chapter of Sanhedrin, delineates the rules governing who may provide written or oral testimony. A valid witness in a Jewish Beit Din must be an adult (see Bar Mitzvah) free man, not a woman or a slave, and not be related to any of the other witnesses or judges. The witness must be an honest person who can be trusted not to lie.

The Mishnah (Sanhedrin 24b) states: "The following people are disqualified: a gambler with dice, a lender who collects interest, a chaser of doves, and a merchant who profits from produce of Shemittah." The Talmud explains that each of these four activities falls within an expanded definition of theft because people who violate Torah laws or social norms in pursuit of money cannot be trusted to tell the truth. "Chasers of doves" are those training them for races (or to lure other people's birds away), as well as those who bet on them; it includes pigeons, and by extension the use and luring of any animals in such fashion, domesticated or otherwise.

Additionally, "one who eats in the street is comparable to a dog, and there are those who say that he is disqualified from serving as a witness." (Talmud, Kiddushin 40b)

=== Reinstatement ===
However, anyone who has engaged in these forbidden activities may be reinstated upon undertaking a complete reversal to demonstrate especially honest conduct by renouncing a permitted activity.

- Gamblers with dice...when are they reinstated? When they destroy their dice and completely reverse themselves, so that they do not play even for free.
- Lenders who collect interest...when are they reinstated? When they tear up their promissory notes and completely reverse themselves, so that they do not collect interest even from a non-Jewish lender.
- Chasers of doves...when are they reinstated? When they destroy their tools for chasing and completely reverse themselves, so that they do not chase doves even in the desert [where there is nobody from whom to steal].
- Merchants who profit from produce of Shemittah...when are they reinstated? When the next Shemittah year arrives [seven years later] and they withdraw.
  - Rabbi Nehemiah said: They required not only a reversal of words, but also a reversal of money. How so? A person proclaims, "I, John Doe, profited 200 Zuz from selling fruits of Shemittah, and I am now giving this money to charity." (Sanhedrin 25b)
