= Ahavat Olam =

Jewish prayer

Ahavat Olam (Hebrew: אהבת עולם, Eternal love) is the second prayer that is recited during Maariv, the evening service in Judaism. It is the parallel blessing to Ahava rabbah that is recited during Shacharit, and likewise, is an expression to God for the gift of the Torah.

In the nusach Ashkenaz, Ahava Rabbah is recited in the morning, and Ahavat Olam is recited in the evening as a compromise. Sephardim recite Ahavat Olam at both Shacharit and Maariv. The debate over this recitation occurred between the Geonim. Amram ben Sheshna ruled according to the current Ashkenazi custom, whereas later geonim - Saadia Gaon, Sherira ben Hanina, and Hai ben Sherira - called for reciting Ahavat Olam at both prayers.

== Theme ==
The theme of Ahavat Olam is that God provides love in good times and in bad. Nighttime, when there is darkness, is a time associated with danger. Nevertheless, God provides protection at night, and the sun always rises in the morning.

Ahavat Olam is also seen as the blessing over the mitzvah of the recitation of the Shema.

== Alternative version for Shabbat ==
In the Siddur of Saadia Gaon, there is an alternative version of this blessing for Shabbat. For an unknown reason, in the Italian nusach, the special texts from the Siddur of Saadia Gaon were adopted for the other blessings, but not for this one.
