= Acrostic =

Text formed from parts of another text

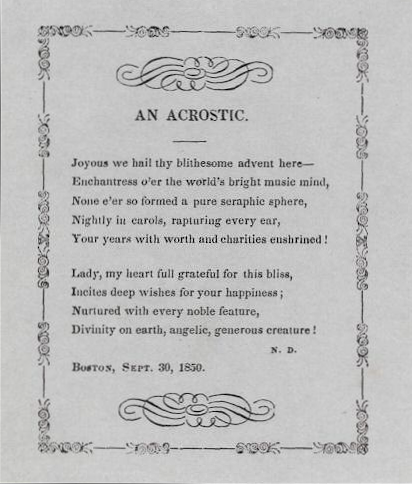
An 1850 acrostic by Nathaniel Dearborn, the first letter of each line spelling the name "JENNY LIND"

An acrostic is a poem or other word composition in which the first letter (or syllable, or word) of each new line (or paragraph, or other recurring feature in the text) spells out a word, message or the alphabet. The term comes from the French acrostiche from post-classical Latin acrostichis, from Koine Greek ἀκροστιχίς, from Ancient Greek ἄκρος "highest, topmost" and στίχος "verse". As a form of constrained writing, an acrostic can be used as a mnemonic device to aid memory retrieval. When the last letter of each new line (or other recurring feature) forms a word it is called a telestich (or telestic); the combination of an acrostic and a telestich in the same composition is called a double acrostic (e.g. the first-century Latin Sator Square).

Acrostics are common in medieval literature, where they usually serve to highlight the name of the poet or his patron, or to make a prayer to a saint. They are most frequent in verse works but can also appear in prose. The Middle High German poet Rudolf von Ems for example opens all his great works with an acrostic of his name, and his world chronicle marks the beginning of each age with an acrostic of the key figure (Moses, David, etc.). In chronicles, acrostics are common in German and English but rare in other languages.

== Form ==
Relatively simple acrostics may merely spell out the letters of the alphabet in order; such an acrostic may be called an 'alphabetical acrostic' or abecedarius. These acrostics occur in the Hebrew Bible in the first four of the five chapters of the Book of Lamentations, in the praise of the good wife in Proverbs 31:10-31, and in Psalms 9-10, 25, 34, 37, 111, 112, 119 and 145. Notable among the acrostic Psalms is the long Psalm 119, which typically is printed in subsections named after the 22 letters of the Hebrew alphabet, each section consisting of 8 verses, each of which begins with the same letter of the alphabet and the entire psalm consisting of 22 x 8 = 176 verses; and Psalm 145, which is recited three times a day in the Jewish services. Some acrostic psalms are technically imperfect. For example, Psalm 9 and Psalm 10 appear to constitute a single acrostic psalm together, but the length assigned to each letter is unequal and five of the 22 letters of the Hebrew alphabet are not represented and the sequence of two letters is reversed. In Psalm 25 one Hebrew letter is not represented, the following letter (Resh) repeated. In Psalm 34 the current final verse, 23, does fit verse 22 in content, but adds an additional line to the poem. In Psalms 37 and 111 the numbering of verses and the division into lines are interfering with each other; as a result in Psalm 37, for the letters Daleth and Kaph there is only one verse, and the letter Ayin is not represented. Psalm 111 and 112 have 22 lines, but 10 verses. Psalm 145 does not represent the letter Nun, having 21 one verses, but one Qumran manuscript of this Psalm does have that missing line, which agrees with the Septuagint. Some, like O Palmer Robertson, see the acrostic Psalms of book 1 and book 5 of Psalms as teaching and memory devices as well as transitions between subjects in the structure of the Psalms.

Often the ease of detectability of an acrostic can depend on the intention of its creator. In some cases an author may desire an acrostic to have a better chance of being perceived by an observant reader, such as the acrostic contained in the Hypnerotomachia Poliphili (where the key capital letters are decorated with ornate embellishments). However, acrostics may also be used as a form of steganography, where the author seeks to conceal the message rather than proclaim it. This might be achieved by making the key letters uniform in appearance with the surrounding text, or by aligning the words in such a way that the relationship between the key letters is less obvious. These are referred to as null ciphers in steganography, using the first letter of each word to form a hidden message in an otherwise innocuous text. Using letters to hide a message, as in acrostic ciphers, was popular during the Renaissance, and could employ various methods of enciphering, such as selecting other letters than initials based on a repeating pattern (equidistant letter sequences), or even concealing the message by starting at the end of the text and working backwards.

== Examples ==
=== Greek ===
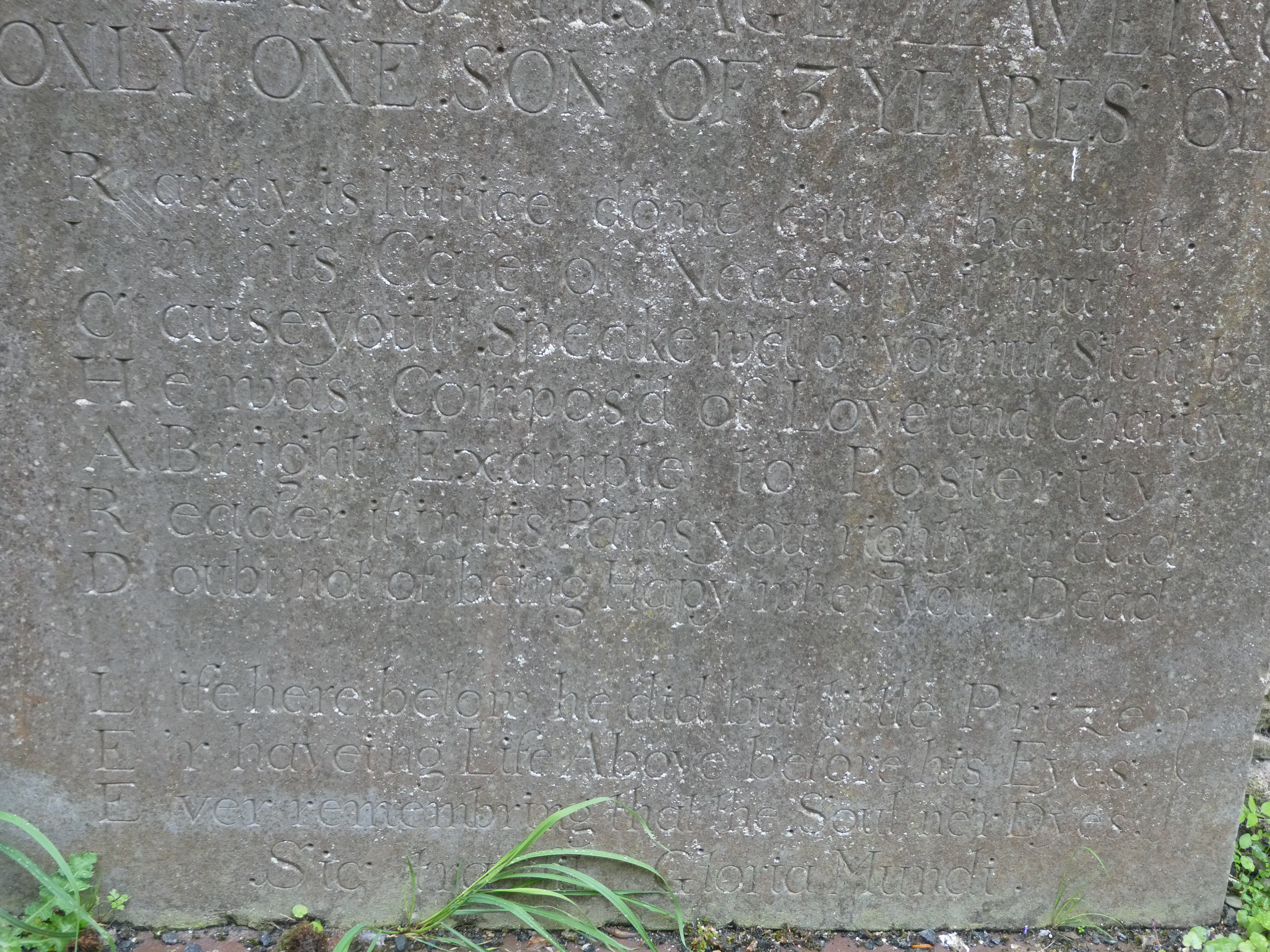
Acrostic poem on a tombstone in Kilfane Church, Ireland

A well-known acrostic in Greek is for the phrase JESUS CHRIST, GOD’S SON, SAVIOUR, the initial letters of which spell ΙΧΘΥΣ (ICHTHYS), which means fish:

Ιησοῦς    I  ēsoûs   Jesus
Χριστός   CH ristós  Christ
Θεοῦ      TH eoû     God's
Υἱός      Y  iós     Son
Σωτήρ     S  ōtḗr    Saviour

According to Cicero, acrostics were a regular feature of Sibylline prophecies (which were written in Greek hexameters. The type of acrostic is that known as a “gamma acrostic” (from the shape of the Greek letter Γ), where the same words are found both horizontally and vertically. Cicero refers to an acrostic in this passage using the Greek word ἀκροστιχίς.

The 3rd-century BC didactic poet Aratus, who was much admired and imitated by Cicero, Virgil and other Latin writers, appears to have started a fashion for using acrostics. One example is the famous passage in Phaenomena 783–7 where the word λεπτή 'slender, subtle' occurs as a gamma acrostic and also twice in the text, as well as diagonally in the text and even cryptically taking the initial letters of certain words in lines 2 and 1:

λεπτὴ μὲν καθαρή τε περὶ τρίτον ἦμαρ ἐοῦσα
εὔδιός κ’ εἴη, λεπτὴ δὲ καὶ εὖ μάλ’ ἐρευθὴς
πνευματίη, παχίων δὲ καὶ ἀμβλείῃσι κεραίαις
τέτρατον ἐκ τριτάτοιο φόως ἀμενηνὸν ἔχουσα
ἢ νότῳ ἄμβλυνται ἢ ὕδατος ἐγγὺς ἐόντος.

leptḕ mèn katharḗ te perì tríton êmar eoûsa
eúdiós k’ eíē, leptḕ dè kaì eû mál’ ereuthḕs
pneumatíē, pakhíōn dè kaì ambleíēisi keraíais
tétraton ek tritátoio phóōs amenēnòn ékhousa
ḕ nótōi ámbluntai ḕ húdatos engùs eóntos.

“If (the moon is) slender and clear about the third day,
she will bode fair weather; if slender and very red,
wind; if the crescent is thickish, with blunted horns,
having a feeble fourth-day light after the third day,
either it is blurred by a southerly or because rain is in the offing.” (trans. Jerzy Danielewicz)

=== Latin ===
Several acrostics have recently been discovered in Roman poets, especially in Virgil. Among others, in Eclogue 9 the acrostic VNDIS 'in the waves' (lines 34–38) immediately precedes the words quis est nam ludus in undis? 'for what is your game in the waves?'', and DEA DIO (i.e. dea Dione 'the goddess Dione') (lines 46–51) in a passage which mentions the goddess Dione (another name for Venus). In Eclogue 8, alongside a passage dedicating the poem to an unnamed person and asking him to accept it, Neil Adkin reads the words TV SI ES ACI (i.e. accipe) ('if you are the one, accept!').

In Aeneid 7.601–4, a passage which mentions Mars and war, describing the custom of opening the gates of the Temple of Janus, the name MARS (the god of war) appears in acrostic form as well as in the text as follows:

Mos erat Hesperio in Latio, quem protinus urbes
Albanae coluere sacrum, nunc maxima rerum
Roma colit, cum prima movent in proelia Martem,
Sive Getis inferre manu lacrimabile bellum …

“It was a custom in Hesperian Latium, which originally the Alban
cities kept as sacred, and now, greatest of entities,
Rome keeps, whenever they move Mars to the first battles,
whether (they are preparing) to bring tearful war to the Getae …”

In Georgics 1 429–433, next to a passage which contains the words namque is certissimus auctor 'for he is the most certain author', the double-letter reverse acrostic MA VE PV (i.e. Publius Vergilius Maro) is found on alternate lines.

In Eclogue 6, 13–24 Virgil uses a double acrostic, with the same word LAESIS 'for those who have been harmed' going both upwards and downwards starting from the same letter L in line 19. Another double acrostic is found in Aeneid 2, where the word PITHI (i.e. πείθει, Greek for he ‘persuades’ or ‘he deceives’) is found first backwards at 103–107, then forwards at 142–146, at the beginning and end of a speech by Sinon persuading the Trojans to bring the wooden horse into the city. The discoverer of this acrostic, Neil Adkin, points out that the same word πείθει occurs at more or less exactly the same line-numbers in a repeated line describing how Odysseus’ wife Penelope deceived the suitors in Odyssey 2.106 and 24.141.

Another transliterated Greek word used as an acrostic in a pseudo-Sibylline prophecy has recently been noticed in the syllables DE CA TE (i.e. Greek δεκάτη 'tenth') in Eclogue 4, 9–11, with the same DEC A TE repeated cryptically both forwards and backwards in line 11.

In another pseudo-Sibylline prophecy in poem 5 of Tibullus book 2 the words AVDI ME ‘hear me!’ are picked out in the first letters of alternate lines at the beginning of the prophecy.

Virgil’s friend Horace also made occasional use of acrostics, but apparently much less than Virgil. Examples are DISCE ‘learn!’ (Odes 1.18.11–15) (forming a gamma acrostic with the word discernunt 'they discern' in line 18) and OTIA 'leisure' in Satires 1.2.7–10, which appears just after Horace has been advised to take a rest from writing satire. The acrostic OTIA also occurs in Ovid, Metamorphoses 15.478–81, a passage describing the return of the peace-loving king Numa Pompilius to Rome. Odes 4.2, which starts with the word Pindarum '(the poet) Pindar' has next to it the truncated acrostic PIN in a gamma formation. In the first poem of Horace's Epodes (which were also known as Iambi 'iambics'), the first two lines begin ibis ... amice, and it has been suggested that these words were deliberately chosen so that their initial letters IBI ... AM could be rearranged to read IAMBI. In his famous lines in the Ars Poetica, lines 136–9, containing the proverb "mountains will give birth, but there will be born (nothing but) a ridiculous mouse", Horace writes a telestic MVS joined to the word mus 'mouse', adding to the humour of the passage. (See The Mountain in Labour.)

Towards the end of the 2nd century AD a verse-summary of the plot was added to each of the plays of Plautus. Each of these has an acrostic of the name of the play, for example:

Conservam uxorem duo conservi expetunt.
Alium senex allēgat, alium filius.
Senem adiuvat sors: verum decipitur dolis.
Ita ei subicitur pro puella servolus
Nequam, qui dominum mulcat atque vilicum.
Adulescens ducit civem Casinam cognitam.

“Two fellow slaves seek a fellow female slave as a wife;
The old man commissions one of them, his son the other.
A lottery helps the old man; but he is deceived by tricks.
So, instead of the girl, a young slave is substituted,
a naughty one, who beats up the master and the farm-manager.
The young man marries Casina after she is recognised as a citizen.”

The 3rd century AD poet Commodian wrote a series of 80 short poems on Christian themes called Instructiones. Each of these is fully acrostic (with the exception of poem 60, where the initial letters are in alphabetical order), starting with PRAEFATIO ‘preface’ and INDIGNATIO DEI ‘the wrath of God’. The initials of poem 80, read backwards, give COMMODIANUS MENDICUS CHRISTI ‘Commodian, Christ’s beggar’.

=== Mandaean ===
Chapters 2–5 of Book 12 in the Right Ginza, a Mandaic text, are acrostic hymns, with each stanza ordered according to a letter of the Mandaic alphabet.

=== Dutch ===
There is an acrostic secreted in the Dutch national anthem Wilhelmus (William): the first letters of its fifteen stanzas spell WILLEM VAN NASSOV (the then name for Nassau). This was one of the hereditary titles of William the Silent, who introduces himself in the poem to the Dutch people. This title also returned in the 2010 speech from the throne, during the Dutch State Opening of Parliament, whose first 15 lines also formed WILLEM VAN NASSOV.

=== English ===
Vladimir Nabokov's short story "The Vane Sisters" is known for its acrostic final paragraph, which contains a message from beyond the grave.

In 1829, Edgar Allan Poe wrote an acrostic and simply titled it "An Acrostic", possibly dedicated to his cousin Elizabeth Rebecca Herring (though the initials L.E.L. refer to Letitia Elizabeth Landon):

Elizabeth it is in vain you say
"Love not" — thou sayest it in so sweet a way:
In vain those words from thee or L.E.L.
Zantippe's talents had enforced so well:
Ah! if that language from thy heart arise,
Breath it less gently forth — and veil thine eyes.
Endymion, recollect, when Luna tried
To cure his love — was cured of all beside —
His folly — pride — and passion — for he died.

An even more complicated acrostic was his sonnet "An Enigma" (1848) containing the hidden name of Sarah Anna Lewis (first letter of the first line, second letter of the second line, etc.).

In 1939, Rolfe Humphries received a lifelong ban from contributing to Poetry magazine after he penned and attempted to publish "a poem containing a concealed scurrilous phrase aimed at a well-known person", namely Nicholas Murray Butler. The poem, entitled "An ode for a Phi Beta Kappa affair", was in unrhymed iambic pentameter, contained one classical reference per line, and ran as follows:

Niobe's daughters yearn to the womb again,
Ionians bright and fair, to the chill stone;
Chaos in cry, Actaeon's angry pack,
Hounds of Molossus, shaggy wolves driven

Over Ampsanctus' vale and Pentheus' glade,
Laelaps and Ladon, Dromas, Canace,
As these in fury harry brake and hill
So the great dogs of evil bay the world.

Memory, Mother of Muses, be resigned
Until King Saturn comes to rule again!
Remember now no more the golden day
Remember now no more the fading gold,
Astraea fled, Proserpina in hell;
You searchers of the earth be reconciled!

Because, through all the blight of human woe,
Under Robigo's rust, and Clotho's shears,
The mind of man still keeps its argosies,
Lacedaemonian Helen wakes her tower,

Echo replies, and lamentation loud
Reverberates from Thrace to Delos Isle;
Itylus grieves, for whom the nightingale
Sweetly as ever tunes her Daulian strain.
And over Tenedos the flagship burns.

How shall men loiter when the great moon shines
Opaque upon the sail, and Argive seas
Rear like blue dolphins their cerulean curves?
Samos is fallen, Lesbos streams with fire,
Etna in rage, Canopus cold in hate,
Summon the Orphic bard to stranger dreams.

And so for us who raise Athene's torch.
Sufficient to her message in this hour:
Sons of Columbia, awake, arise!

Acrostic: Nicholas Murray Butler is a horse's ass.

In an October 2009 veto message by California governor Arnold Schwarzenegger, rejecting a bill introduced by assemblyman Tom Ammiano, the first letters of lines 3–9 spelled "Fuck You"; Schwarzenegger claimed that the acrostic message was coincidental, which mathematicians Stephen Devlin and Philip Stark disputed as statistically implausible.

In January 2010, Jonathan I. Schwartz, the CEO of Sun Microsystems, sent an email to Sun employees on the completion of the acquisition of Sun by Oracle Corporation. The initial letters of the first seven paragraphs spelled "Beat IBM".

James May, who would later become a presenter on the BBC program Top Gear, was fired from the publication Autocar for spelling out a message using the large red initial at the beginning of each review in the publication's Road Test Yearbook Issue for 1992. Properly punctuated, the message reads: "So you think it's really good, yeah? You should try making the bloody thing up; it's a real pain in the arse."

In the 2012 third novel of his Caged Flower series, author Cullman Wallace used acrostics as a plot device. The parents of a protagonist send e-mails where the first letters of the lines reveal their situation in a concealed message.

On 19 August 2017, the members of president Donald Trump's Committee on Arts and Humanities resigned in protest over his response to the Unite the Right rally incident in Charlottesville, Virginia. The members' letter of resignation contained the acrostic "RESIST" formed from the first letter of each paragraph.

On 23 August 2017, University of California, Berkeley energy professor Daniel Kammen resigned from his position as a State Department science envoy with a resignation letter in which the word "IMPEACH" was spelled out by the first letters of each paragraph.

In the video game Zork the first letters of sentences in a prayer spelled "Odysseus" which was a possible solution to a Cyclops encounter in another room.

All three seasons of the American animated series The Owl House use acrostics in their episode titles. The first two seasons use the first letters to spell out "A WITCH LOSES A TRUE WAY" and "SEEK THE KEY, FEAR THE LOCK," respectively; while, the third season uses the first words to spell out "Thanks For Watching."

After the San Jose Sharks defeated the Vegas Golden Knights in an April 24, 2022 game, the following Tuesday night during a Sharks home game saw messages on the jumbotron being shared by the team during the intermissions. One of them was a message mentioning the recent win which containing an acrostic that spelled out "Fuck the Knights".

In 2023, pop singer Shakira released the song "Acróstico", which spells out the names of her children Milan and Sasha in the first letters of each line.

On 4 May 2024, Noelia Voigt resigned as Miss USA 2023 with a resignation letter containing an acrostic spelling out "I am silenced".

== Multiple acrostics ==
=== Double acrostics ===
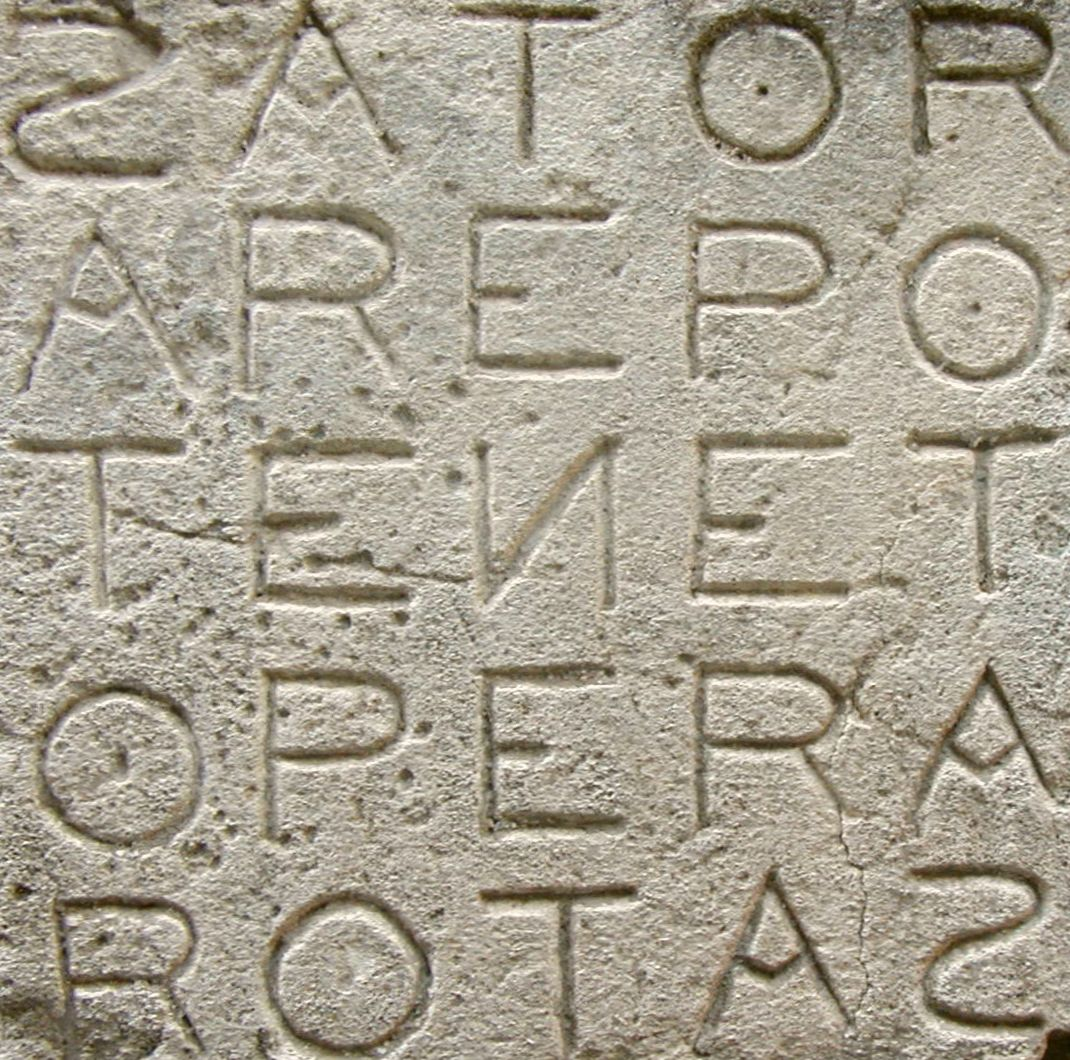
A Sator square (in SATOR-form), on a wall in the medieval fortress town of Oppède-le-Vieux, France

A double acrostic, may have words at the beginning and end of its lines, as in this example, on the name of Stroud, by Paul Hansford:

 S et among hills in the midst of  five valley S,
 T his peaceful little   market town we inhabi T
 R efuses  (vociferously!) to  be  a  conforme R.
 O nce home  of  the cloth  it gave its name t O,
 U phill and down again its  streets  lead  yo U.
 D espite its faults it leaves  us all  charme D.

The first letters make up the acrostic and the last letters the telestich; in this case they are identical.

Another example of a double acrostic is the first-century Latin Sator Square.

S A T O R
A R E P O
T E N E T
O P E R A
R O T A S

As well as being a double acrostic, the square contains several palindromes, and it can be read as a 25-letter palindromic sentence (of an obscure meaning).

=== Complex acrostics ===
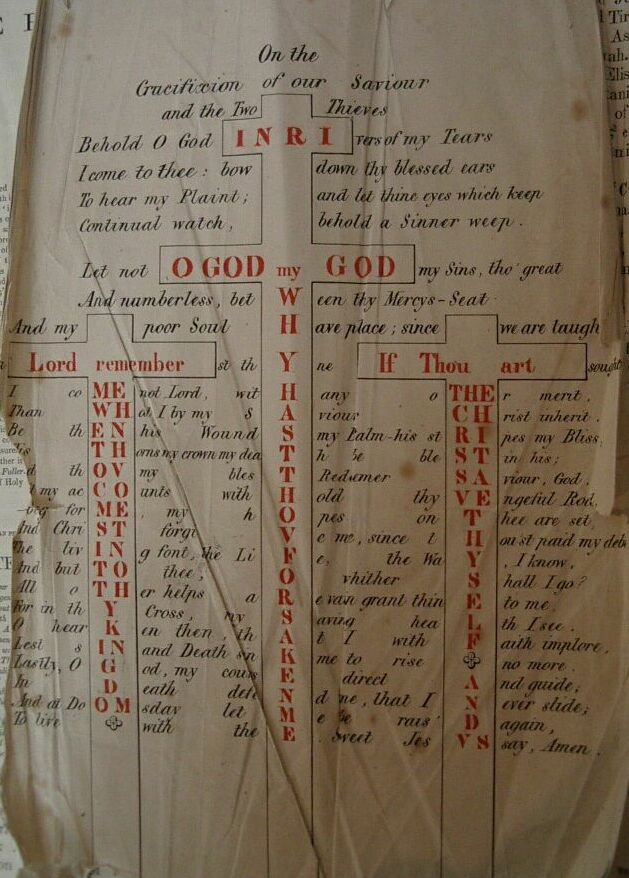

The poem Behold, O God!, by William Browne, can be considered a complex kind of acrostic. In a document held in the Church of St Michael, Withington, Gloucestershire, some letters are capitalized and written extra-large, non-italic, and in red, and the lines are shifted left or right and internally spaced out as necessary to position the red letters within three crosses that extend through all the lines of the poem. The letters within each cross spell out a verse from the New Testament:

- left: Luke 23:42: "**Lord, remember me when thou comest into thy kingdom.**"
- middle: Matthew 27:46: "**O God, my God, why hast thou forsaken me**?"
- right: Luke 23:39: "**If thou art the Christ, save thyself and us.**"

The "INRI" at the top of the middle cross stands for Iēsus Nazarēnus, Rēx Iūdaeōrum, Latin for "Jesus of Nazareth, King of the Jews" (John 19:19). The three quotes represent the three figures crucified on Golgotha, as recorded in the gospels of Matthew and Luke.

(The text of the document shown differs significantly from the text usually published, including in the reference. Many of the lines have somewhat different wording; and while the acrostics are the same as far as they go, the published text is missing the last four lines, truncating the acrostics to "Lord, remember me when thou comest into thy kin", "O God, my God, why hast thou forsak", and "If thou art the Christ, save thyself". The manuscript text is printed below, first as normal poetry, then spaced and bolded to bring out the acrostics. The word "Thou" in line 8 is not visible in this photograph, but is in the published version and is included in a cross-stitch sampler of the poem from 1793.)

Behold, O God! In rivers of my tears
I come to thee! bow down thy blessed ears
To hear my Plaint; and let thine eyes which keep
Continual watch behold a Sinner weep:
Let not, O God my God my Sins, tho' great,
And numberless, between thy Mercy's-Seat
And my poor Soul have place; since we are taught,
[Thou] Lord, remember'st thyne, if Thou art sought.
I come not, Lord, with any other merit
Than what I by my Saviour Christ inherit:
Be then his wounds my balm— his stripes my Bliss;
His thorns my crown; my death be blest in his.
And thou, my blest Redeemer, Saviour, God,
Quit my accounts, withhold thy vengeful rod!
O beg for me, my hopes on Thee are set;
And Christ forgive me, since thou'st paid my debt
The living font, the Life, the Way, I know,
And but to thee, O whither shall I go?
All other helps are vain: grant thine to me,
For in thy cross my saving health I see.
O hearken then, that I with faith implore,
Lest Sin and Death sink me to rise no more.
Lastly, O God, my course direct and guide,
In Death defend me, that I never slide;
And at Doomsday let me be rais'd again,
To live with thee sweet Jesus say, Amen.

                  Behold,  O  God!  IN RI  vers of my tears
               I come to thee! bow         down thy blessed ears
                To hear my Plaint;         and let thine eyes which keep
                   Continual watch         behold a Sinner weep:
                  Let not,      O GOD my GOD        my Sins, tho' great,
                  And numberless, bet-W-een thy Mercy's-Seat
      And my    poor             Soul H-ave place; since      we are taught,
[Thou] Lord, remember st           th-Y-ne,            If Thou art sought.
        I co-ME not, Lord,        wit-H any             o-THE-r merit
       Than  WH-at I by          my S-A-viour             CH-rist inherit:
       Be th-EN his             Wound-S  my Balm—  his St-RI-pes my Bliss;
         His TH-orns my crown; my dea-T-h       be    ble-ST in his.
      And th-OU,              my bles-T Redeemer,         SA-viour, God,
  Quit my ac-CO-unts,            with-H-old           thy VE-ngeful rod!
   O beg for ME,                 my h-O-pes             on T-hee are set;
    And Chri-ST                 forgi-V-e   me,   since  t-H-ou'st paid my debt
     The liv-IN-g        font, the Li-F-e,     the      Wa-Y, I know,
     And but TO thee,                 O whither            S-hall I go?
       All o-TH-er            helps a-R-e vain: grant thin-E to me,
   For in th-Y  cross             my  S-aving          hea-L-th I see.
      O hear-K-en then,            th-A-t       I    with  F-aith implore,
      Lest S-IN and        Death  sin-K me    to      rise + no more.
   Lastly, O G-od,          my  cours-E direct             A-nd guide,
          In D-eath              defe-N-d me,   that     I N-ever slide;
   And at Do-OM-sday              let M-e    be      rais'-D  again,
     To live + with               the-E sweet         Jes-US  say, Amen.

== See also ==
- Acronym – Abbreviation consisting of initial letters of a phrase
- Backronym – Acronym invented to fit an existing word
- Canon – Structured hymn used in a number of Eastern Orthodox services
- Easter egg (media) – Something hidden within a work
- Golden shovel – Poetic form
- Mesostic – Type of poem or text
- Mnemonic – Learning technique that helps in remembering
- O Antiphons – Christian short chant
- Rikei – Japanese noble lady, calligrapher, poet and scholar
- Steganography – Hiding messages in other messages
- Word square – Words can be read horizontally and vertically
