= Claude Fraysse =

French composer

- Born: 31 July 1941; Versailles, France
- Died: 2012 (aged 70–71)
- Occupations: Trombonist; Composer

Claude Fraysse (1941–2012) was a French composer.

== History ==
Fraysse was born in Versailles on 31 July 1941. In the 1960s, he played in the varieté orchestra "Johann Ness" as a saxophonist, akkordion player and flutist, and also worked as a chanson singer. He collaborated with Charles Aznavour and Jacques Brel, among others, who became his friends.

In the 1970s, he taught trombone and tuba at the conservatoire in Romans. Influenced by Alain Bergèse, who taught classical guitar there, he became interested in Christianity in 1973. He composed melodies for hymns, aimed at bringing young people to singing. He organised music groups such as Les troubadours de l'Espoir, and held seminars promoting new Christian songs. From 1974, he also gave music lessons at schools. In 1993, he became a pastor of the Reformed Church. He recorded songs, and published a book narrating his conversion.

His song "Je louerai l’Eternel" (I will praise the Eternal one) with a harmonisation by Bergèse, was translated into German as Ich lobe meinen Gott von ganzem Herzen and became a popular new hymn.

Another song "C'est vers toi que je me tourne" ("It is to you that I turn"), composed also with Bergèse with lyrics written by Leila Hamrat, was translated into Chinese as 獻上活祭 and is popular among Chinese American churches in the United States.
