= Alphabiography =

An alphabiography is an autobiography, often set as an English studies project for high school or college students, consisting of a set of twenty-six short stories or chapters about the writer's life. Each story or chapter has a title starting with a different letter of the alphabet, for example: "Apple growing", "Baseball", "Cynthia" etc. At the end a summation is undertaken.

== Examples ==
The book Totally Joe by James Howe is about Joe Bunch, who is given an assignment to write his alphabiography – although he thinks it will be boring, it turns out to be the gateway for him to learn much about his own identity as a gay young adult.

ReadWriteThink.org, a website sponsored by the National Council of Teachers of English and the International Reading Association, includes a lesson plan for an alphabiography project.

== See also ==
- Abecedarius
