= Ich lobe meinen Gott von ganzem Herzen =

1979 German Christian hymn

- Christian hymn
- English: I praise my God with all my heart
- Occasion: Gloria
- Written: 1979
- Text: by Gitta Leuschner, Günter Balders
- Language: German
- Based on: Psalm 9
- Melody: by Claude Fraysse
- Composed: 1976
- Published: 1995

"Ich lobe meinen Gott von ganzem Herzen" (I praise my God with all my heart) is a Christian hymn in German, with a first stanza by Gitta Leuschner, written in 1980, and two more stanzas that Günter Balders added in 2002. The text is based on Psalm 9. The original song came from France and was a rather close paraphrase of the psalm, to a melody composed by Claude Fraysse in 1976. The song of the genre Neues Geistliches Lied (NGL) has appeared in the German Protestant and Catholic hymnals and songbooks, especially collections for children.

== History ==
The hymn "Ich lobe meinen Gott von ganzem Herzen" was first a French paraphrase of Psalm 9, "Je louerai l’Eternel" (I will praise the Eternal one) by Yves Kéler. The melody was composed by Claude Fraysse (1941–2012) in 1976. He was professor of trombone and tuba in Romans-sur-Isère and from 1993 a pastor of the Reformed Church of France. He aimed at bringing young people to singing.

The text was translated into German, the first stanza by Gitta Leuschner in 1980, and two more stanzas by Günter Balders in 2002. This short text is based on verses 2 and 3 of the psalm. The song of the genre Neues Geistliches Lied (NGL) appears in the German Protestant hymnal of 1995 as EG 272.

A version combining the first stanza with a second stanza by an anonymous author, that praises Jesus as a reason for hope, became part of the German Catholic hymnal Gotteslob in 2013, as GL 400 in the section Leben in Gott – Lob, Dank und Anbetung (Life in God – Praise, thanks and adoration). Different versions are part of songbooks, especially of collections for young people. In an alternate version, Karl Stadelmayr add four stanzas as a closer translation of the French song to the first stanza.

== Text, music and theme ==
Like Psalm 9, the text expresses praise of God from a heart full of joy and cheerfulness. Each stanza follows a scheme of repetitions, for example:

Ich lobe meinen Gott von ganzem Herzen.
Erzählen will ich von all seinen Wundern und singen seinem Namen.
Ich lobe meinen Gott von ganzem Herzen.
Ich freue mich und bin fröhlich, Herr, in dir. Halleluja!
Ich freue mich und bin fröhlich, Herr, in dir. Halleluja!

The third line repeats the first line in both text and music, while the music of all other lines is mostly the same. The music is in D major, with a range of only six notes. The melody is full of lively eighth-notes, and aspects of dance.
