= Autobiography =

Self-written biography

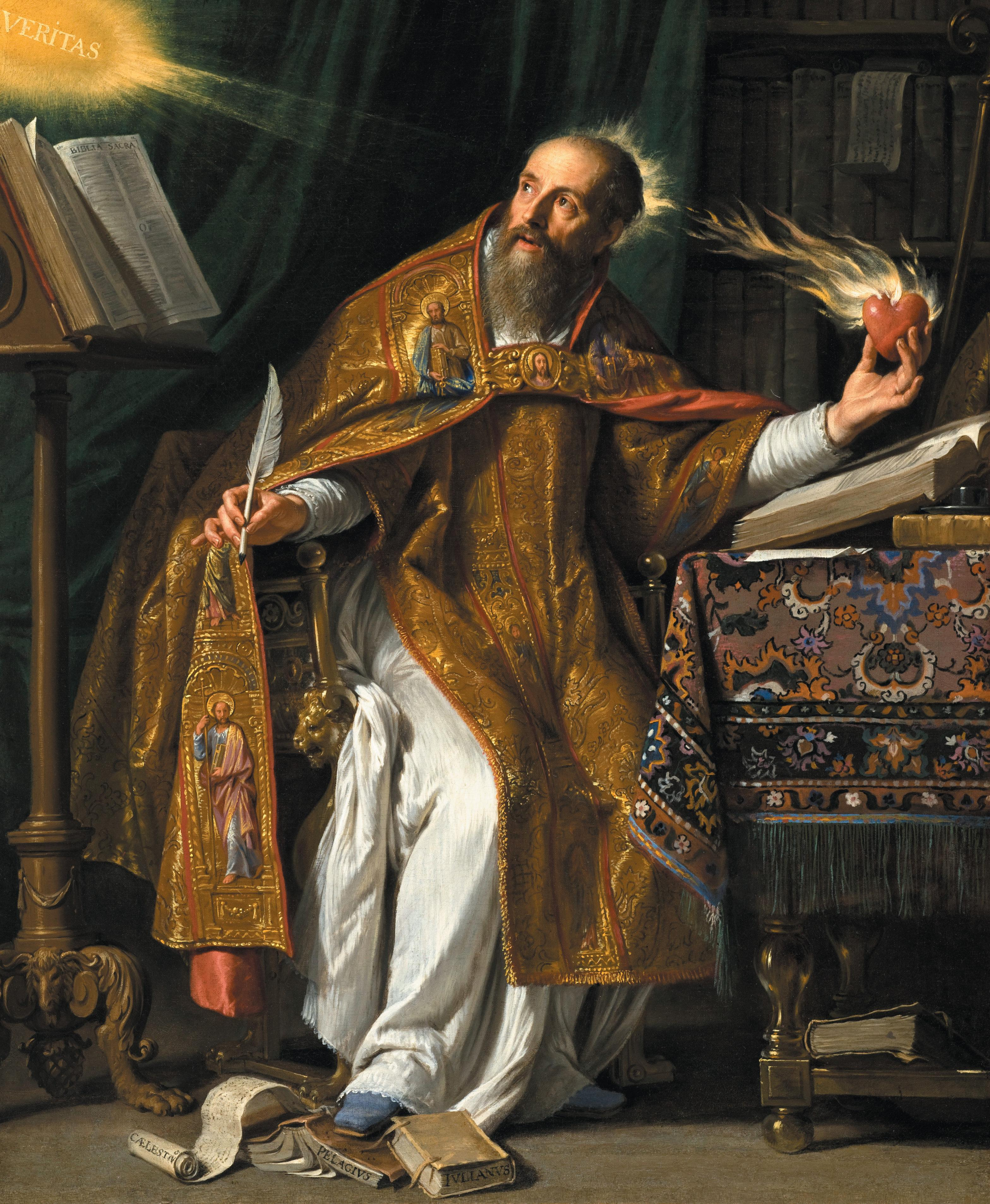
Saint Augustine of Hippo wrote Confessions, the first Western autobiography ever written, around AD 400. Portrait by Philippe de Champaigne, 17th century.

An autobiography, (Note: Autobiography comes from the Greek, αὐτός autos "self" + βίος bios "life" + γράφειν graphein to write) sometimes informally called an autobio, is a self-written account of one's own life, providing a personal narrative that reflects on the author's experiences, memories, and insights. This genre allows individuals to share their unique perspectives and stories, offering readers a glimpse into the author's personal journey and the historical or cultural context in which they lived.

The term "autobiography" was first used in 1797, but the practice of writing about one's life dates back to antiquity. Early examples include Saint Augustine's Confessions (c. 400), which is considered one of the first Western autobiographies. Unlike biographies, which are written by someone else, autobiographies are based on the author's memory and personal interpretation of events, making them inherently subjective. This subjectivity can sometimes lead to inaccuracies or embellishments, as the author may recall events differently or choose to present them in a certain light.

Autobiographies can take various forms, including memoirs, spiritual autobiographies, and fictional autobiographies. Memoirs typically focus on specific memories or themes from the author's life, rather than providing a comprehensive account. Spiritual autobiographies, such as Augustine's Confessions, detail the author's religious journey and spiritual growth. Fictional autobiographies, on the other hand, are novels written in the first person, presenting a fictional character's life as if it were an autobiography.

== Definition ==
The word "autobiography" was first used deprecatingly by William Taylor in 1797 in the English periodical The Monthly Review, when he suggested the word as a hybrid, but condemned it as "pedantic". However, its next recorded use was in its present sense, by Robert Southey in 1809. Despite only being named early in the nineteenth century, first-person autobiographical writing originates in antiquity. Roy Pascal differentiates autobiography from the periodic self-reflective mode of journal or diary writing by noting that "[autobiography] is a review of a life from a particular moment in time, while the diary, however reflective it may be, moves through a series of moments in time". Autobiography thus takes stock of the autobiographer's life from the moment of composition. While biographers generally rely on a wide variety of documents and viewpoints, autobiography may be based entirely on the writer's memory. The memoir form is closely associated with autobiography but it tends, as Pascal claims, to focus less on the self and more on others during the autobiographer's review of their own life.

Autobiographical works are by nature subjective. The inability—or unwillingness—of the author to accurately recall memories has in certain cases resulted in misleading or incorrect information. Some sociologists and psychologists have noted that autobiography offers the author the ability to recreate history.

== Related forms ==
=== Spiritual autobiography ===
Spiritual autobiography is an account of an author's struggle or journey towards God, followed by conversion a religious conversion, often interrupted by moments of regression. The author re-frames their life as a demonstration of divine intention through encounters with the Divine. The earliest example of a spiritual autobiography is Augustine's Confessions though the tradition has expanded to include other religious traditions in works such as Mohandas Gandhi's An Autobiography and Black Elk's Black Elk Speaks. Deliverance from Error by Al-Ghazali is another example. The spiritual autobiography often serves as an endorsement of the writer's religion.

=== Memoirs ===
A memoir is slightly different in character from an autobiography. While an autobiography typically focuses on the "life and times" of the writer, a memoir has a narrower, more intimate focus on the author's memories, feelings and emotions. Memoirs have often been written by politicians or military leaders as a way to record and publish an account of their public exploits. One early example is that of Julius Caesar's Commentarii de Bello Gallico, also known as Commentaries on the Gallic Wars. In the work, Caesar describes the battles that took place during the nine years that he spent fighting local armies in the Gallic Wars. His second memoir, Commentarii de Bello Civili (or Commentaries on the Civil War) is an account of the events that took place between 49 and 48 BC in the civil war against Gnaeus Pompeius and the Senate.

Leonor López de Córdoba (1362–1420) wrote what is supposed to be the first autobiography in Spanish. The English Civil War (1642–1651) provoked a number of examples of this genre, including works by Sir Edmund Ludlow and Sir John Reresby. French examples from the same period include the memoirs of Cardinal de Retz (1614–1679) and the Duc de Saint-Simon.

=== Fictional autobiography ===
The term "fictional autobiography" signifies novels about a fictional character written as though the character were writing their own autobiography, meaning that the character is the first-person narrator and that the novel addresses both internal and external experiences of the character. Daniel Defoe's Moll Flanders is an early example. Charles Dickens' David Copperfield is another such classic, and J.D. Salinger's The Catcher in the Rye is a well-known modern example of fictional autobiography. Charlotte Brontë's Jane Eyre is yet another example of fictional autobiography, as noted on the front page of the original version. The term may also apply to works of fiction purporting to be autobiographies of real characters, e.g., Robert Nye's Memoirs of Lord Byron.

== History ==
=== The classical period: Apologia, oration, confession ===
In antiquity such works were typically entitled apologia, purporting to be self-justification rather than self-documentation. The title of John Henry Newman's 1864 Christian confessional work Apologia Pro Vita Sua refers to this tradition.

The historian Flavius Josephus introduces his autobiography Josephi Vita (c. 99) with self-praise, which is followed by a justification of his actions as a Jewish rebel commander of Galilee.

The rhetor Libanius (c. 314–394) framed his life memoir Oration I (begun in 374) as one of his orations, not of a public kind, but of a literary kind that would not be read aloud in privacy.

Augustine of Hippo (354–430) applied the title Confessions to his autobiographical work, and Jean-Jacques Rousseau used the same title in the 18th century, initiating the chain of confessional and sometimes racy and highly self-critical autobiographies of the Romantic era and beyond. Augustine's was arguably the first Western autobiography ever written, and became an influential model for Christian writers throughout the Middle Ages. It tells of the hedonistic lifestyle Augustine lived for a time within his youth, associating with young men who boasted of their sexual exploits; his following and leaving of the anti-sex and anti-marriage Manichaeism in attempts to seek sexual morality; and his subsequent return to Christianity due to his embracement of Skepticism and the New Academy movement (developing the view that sex is good, and that virginity is better, comparing the former to silver and the latter to gold; Augustine's views subsequently strongly influenced Western theology). Confessions is considered one of the great masterpieces of western literature.

Peter Abelard's 12th-century Historia Calamitatum is in the spirit of Augustine's Confessions, an outstanding autobiographical document of its period. Perhaps even more famous as an autobiography in the 21st century is Monodies written by Guibert de Nogent (c. 1115).

=== Early autobiographies ===
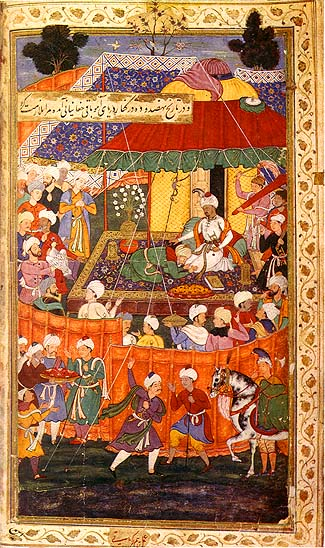
A scene from the Baburnama

In the 15th century, Leonor López de Córdoba, a Spanish noblewoman, wrote her Memorias, which may be the first autobiography in Castilian.

Zāhir ud-Dīn Mohammad Bābur, who founded the Mughal dynasty of South Asia, kept a journal Bāburnāma (Chagatai/Persian: بابر نامہ; literally: "Book of Babur" or "Letters of Babur") which was written between 1493 and 1529.

One of the first great autobiographies of the Renaissance is that of the sculptor and goldsmith Benvenuto Cellini (1500–1571), written between 1556 and 1558, and entitled by him simply Vita (Italian: Life). He declares at the start: "No matter what sort he is, everyone who has to his credit what are or really seem great achievements, if he cares for truth and goodness, ought to write the story of his own life in his own hand; but no one should venture on such a splendid undertaking before he is over forty." These criteria for autobiography generally persisted until recent times, and most serious autobiographies of the next three hundred years conformed to them.

Another autobiography of the period is De vita propria, by the Italian mathematician, physician and astrologer Gerolamo Cardano (1574).

One of the first autobiographies written in an Indian language was Ardhakathānaka, written by Banarasidas, who was a Shrimal Jain businessman and poet of Mughal India. The poetic autobiography Ardhakathānaka (The Half Story), was composed in Braj Bhasa, an early dialect of Hindi linked with the region around Mathura.In his autobiography, he describes his transition from an unruly youth, to a religious realization by the time the work was composed. The work also is notable for many details of life in Mughal times.

The earliest known autobiography written in English is the Book of Margery Kempe, written in 1438. Following in the earlier tradition of a life story told as an act of Christian witness, the book describes Margery Kempe's pilgrimages to the Holy Land and Rome, her attempts to negotiate a celibate marriage with her husband, and most of all her religious experiences as a Christian mystic. Extracts from the book were published in the early sixteenth century but the whole text was published for the first time only in 1936.

Possibly the first publicly available autobiography written in English was Captain John Smith's autobiography published in 1630 which was regarded by many as not much more than a collection of tall tales told by someone of doubtful veracity. This changed with the publication of Philip Barbour's definitive biography in 1964 which, amongst other things, established independent factual basis for many of Smith's "tall tales", many of which could not have been known by Smith at the time of writing unless he was actually present at the events recounted.

Other notable English autobiographies of the 17th century include those of Lord Herbert of Cherbury (1643, published 1764) and John Bunyan (Grace Abounding to the Chief of Sinners, 1666).

Jarena Lee (1783–1864) was the first African American woman to have a published biography in the United States.

=== 18th and 19th centuries ===
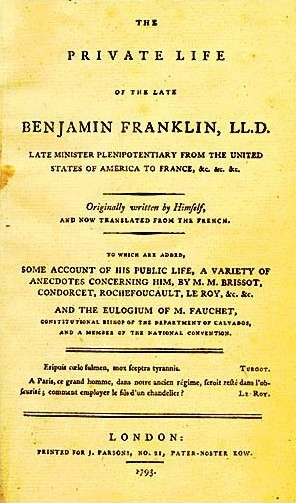
Cover of the first English edition of Benjamin Franklin's autobiography, 1793

Following the trend of Romanticism, which greatly emphasized the role and the nature of the individual, and in the footsteps of Jean-Jacques Rousseau's Confessions, a more intimate form of autobiography, exploring the subject's emotions, came into fashion. Stendhal's autobiographical writings of the 1830s, The Life of Henry Brulard and Memoirs of an Egotist, are both avowedly influenced by Rousseau. An English example is William Hazlitt's Liber Amoris (1823), a painful examination of the writer's love-life.

With the rise of education, cheap newspapers and cheap printing, modern concepts of fame and celebrity began to develop, and the beneficiaries of this were not slow to cash in on this by producing autobiographies. It became the expectation—rather than the exception—that those in the public eye should write about themselves—not only writers such as Charles Dickens (who also incorporated autobiographical elements in his novels) and Anthony Trollope, but also politicians (e.g. Henry Brooks Adams), philosophers (e.g. John Stuart Mill), churchmen such as Cardinal Newman, and entertainers such as P. T. Barnum. Increasingly, in accordance with romantic taste, these accounts also began to deal, amongst other topics, with aspects of childhood and upbringing—far removed from the principles of "Cellinian" autobiography.

=== 20th and 21st centuries ===
From the 17th century onwards, "scandalous memoirs" by supposed libertines, serving a public taste for titillation, have been frequently published. Typically pseudonymous, they were (and are) largely works of fiction written by ghostwriters. So-called "autobiographies" of modern professional athletes and media celebrities—and to a lesser extent about politicians—generally written by a ghostwriter, are routinely published. Some celebrities, such as Naomi Campbell, admit to not having read their "autobiographies". Some sensationalist autobiographies such as James Frey's A Million Little Pieces have been publicly exposed as having embellished or fictionalized significant details of the authors' lives.

Autobiography has become an increasingly popular and widely accessible form. A Fortunate Life by Albert Facey (1979) has become an Australian literary classic. With the critical and commercial success in the United States of such memoirs as Angela’s Ashes and The Color of Water, more and more people have been encouraged to try their hand at this genre. Maggie Nelson's book The Argonauts is one of the recent autobiographies. Maggie Nelson calls it autotheory—a combination of autobiography and critical theory.

A genre where the "claim for truth" overlaps with fictional elements though the work still purports to be autobiographical is autofiction.

== See also ==
- Category:Autobiographies
- Alphabiography
- Autobiographical memory
- I-novel
- Journal therapy
- Letter collection
- List of autobiographies
- Reflective writing
- Unreliable narrator
- Writing therapy
- Personal Archiving

== Bibliography ==
- Barros, Carolyn (1998). Autobiography: Narrative of Transformation. Ann Arbor: University of Michigan Press.
- Buckley, Jerome Hamilton (1994). The Turning Key: Autobiography and the Subjective Impulse Since 1800. Cambridge: Harvard University Press.
- Ferrieux, Robert (2001). L'Autobiographie en Grande-Bretagne et en Irlande. Paris: Ellipses. p. 384. ISBN 9782729800215.
- Lejeune, Philippe (1989). On Autobiography. Minneapolis: University of Minnesota Press.
- Olney, James (1998). Memory & Narrative: The Weave of Life-Writing. Chicago: The University of Chicago Press.
- Pascal, Roy (1960). Design and Truth in Autobiography. Cambridge: Harvard University Press.
- Reynolds, Dwight F., ed. (2001). Interpreting the Self: Autobiography in the Arabic Literary Tradition. Berkeley: University of California Press.
- Wu, Pey-Yi (1990). The Confucian's Progress: Autobiographical Writings in Traditional China. Princeton: Princeton University Press.
