= Leonor López de Córdoba =

Leonor López de Córdoba y Carrillo (Calatayud, ca. 1362-1363 Córdoba, July 1430) wrote what is supposed to be the first autobiography in Castilian, titled Memorias by one of its editors, after being banished from the Castilian Court where she was an advisor and confidant of Queen Catalina of Castile, wife of King Henry III.

== Biographical information ==
According to Memorias, Leonor López de Córdoba was born circa 1362 in Calatayud at the home of Peter of Castile. Since her godmothers were daughters of the King, she spent her childhood at the court, along with her mother, Sancha Carrillo, who was Pedro's kinswoman, Alfonso XI’s niece. After her mother’s early death, Leonor’s father, Martín López de Córdoba, "maestre" [grand master] of the chivalric orders of Calatrava and Alcántara, promised her in marriage to Ruy Gutiérrez de Henestrosa, son of Juan Fernández de Henestrosa, King Pedro's head valet and head majordomo of Queen Blanche of Bourbon.

Following their marriage, Ruy and Leonor moved to Carmona, a fortified city in the south of Spain, near Seville with the rest of the family. While they lived there, Peter I was killed by his half-brother, who assumed the crown as Henry II of Castile, and besieged Carmona, because Martín López and his family were partisans of the murdered king. After several attempts to capture the city, Martín López finally surrendered to Enrique in 1371 under a promise of safe conduct out of the country. However, the king did not keep his promise and killed the maestre and imprisoned his family in the Atarazanas Reales of Seville.

Leonor was only nine years old at the time she and her family were imprisoned. After eight years of hardship, all of her relatives except her husband had died in prison. They were finally set free by a provision in Henry II's will. Leonor then went to the house of her aunt, María García Carrillo, in Córdoba, while her husband tried in vain to recover their lost properties. On her husband's return after seven years of wandering, having recovered nothing, Leonor asked her aunt for a place of her own to dwell. It was in that place that she built both a home and a chapel.

According to historical record, Leonor was the mother of at least three sons and one daughter. When the Black Death struck Córdoba, in 1392, Leonor and her family fled to Santaella and later to Aguilar, where, per Memorias, one of her sons died of the plague after tending to her adopted son, a Jewish boy who had likely been orphaned as a result of the Córdoba pogrom in 1392. Afraid of becoming infected, her aunt's family asked her to leave, and Leonor returned to Córdoba.

In the years after 1403, Leonor dwelt at the court of Henry III of Castile and his queen Catherine of Lancaster, to whom she became a close advisor. The chronicle of John II of Castile's reign writes of Leonor that "Catalina trusted her so much, and loved her in such a way, that nothing was done without her advice” (Estow, 35). Eventually, however, around 1412, Leonor lost the queen's favour and was banished from the court, under threat of being burnt at the stake if she ever returned. She lived in Córdoba until her death in 1420.

== Work ==
Memorias (Memoirs) are at present considered the earliest extant autobiography in Spanish. The original manuscript, formerly at Cordova, is lost. The text has been transcribed and published from eighteenth century copies, one of which is today at the Biblioteca Capitular y Colombina at Seville. It is a short narrative of around nine pages, cast as a notarial document (“Sepan cuantos esta escriptura vieren […],”Let those who see this writing know […]), and although she claims to be the writer of the text, the abundance of legal terms suggests she dictated it to a notary.

Written after her fall from favour at court, the narrative is cast as a testimony of devotion, in which she shows the efficacy of prayer to the Virgin Mary. It is also an apology for her father’s and her own actions. What begins as an act of piety develops into a defense of her family's good name. The prayers included in the Memorias are intended to certify the veracity of Leonor's story, as the favours with which the Virgin Mary has rewarded them must argue that her father's disgrace, imprisonment and death must be unjust, recasting family shame in the light of subsequent divine protection.

The story of physical and spiritual survival in the Memorias constitutes a form of cultural testimony. They may also constitute an alegato (legal pleading) for lost family property.
