= Psalm 9 =

Biblical psalm

- "I will praise thee, O LORD, with my whole heart"
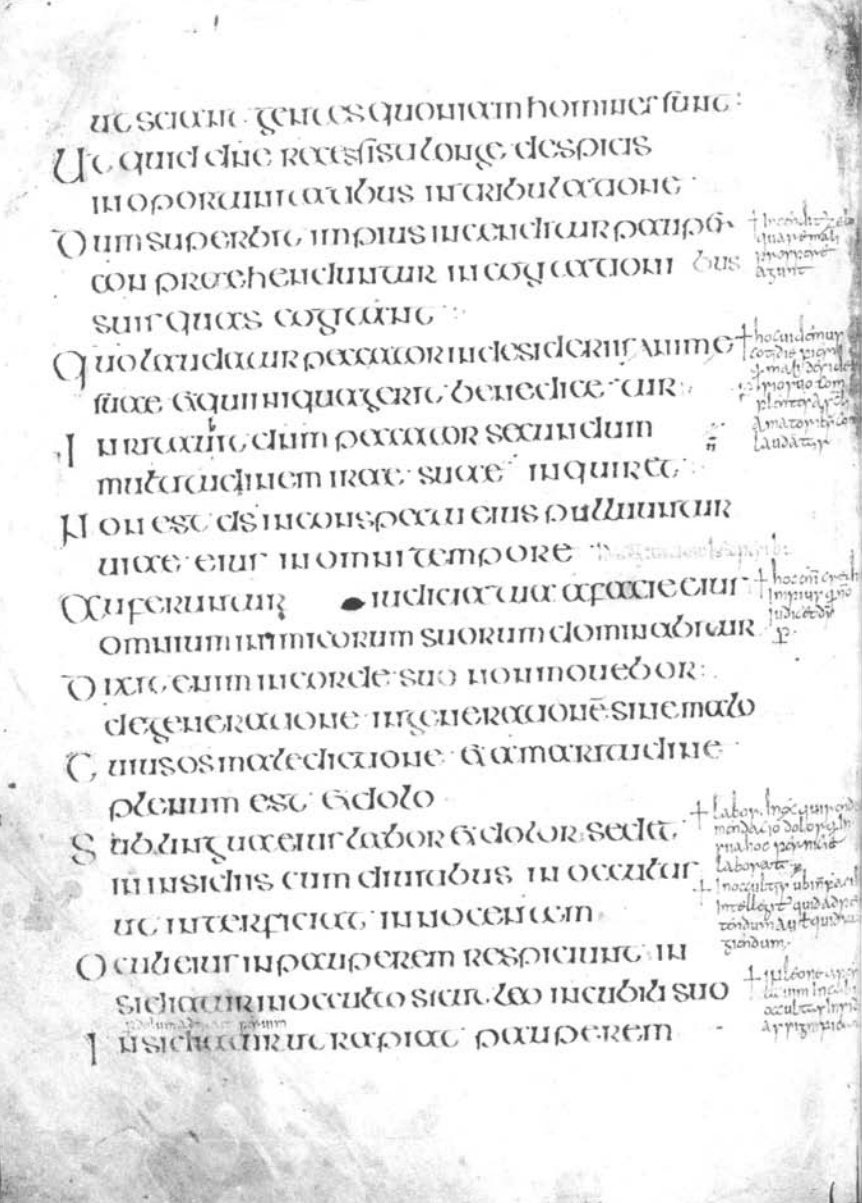
- Psalm 9 in the Blickling Psalter, 8th century
- Other name: "Confitebor tibi Domine"
- Text: by David
- Language: Hebrew (original)

Psalm 9
- ← Psalm 8 Psalm 10 →
- Book: Book of Psalms
- Hebrew Bible part: Ketuvim
- Order in the Hebrew part: 1
- Category: Sifrei Emet
- Christian Bible part: Old Testament
- Order in the Christian part: 19

Psalm 9 is the ninth psalm of the Book of Psalms, beginning in English in the King James Version: "I will praise thee, O LORD, with my whole heart; I will shew forth all thy marvellous works." In Latin, it is known as "Confitebor tibi, Domine". The topic of the psalm is that the success of evil is only temporary, and in the end, the righteous will endure. Psalm 10 is considered part of Psalm 9 in the Greek Septuagint and in most pre-Reformation Christian Bibles. These two consecutive psalms have the form of a single acrostic Hebrew poem.

The psalm is a regular part of Jewish, Catholic, Lutheran, Anglican and other Protestant liturgies.

== Structure ==
The Psalm is an acrostic Hebrew poem, and with Psalm 10 forms a single combined work.

Old Testament scholar Hermann Gunkel divided Psalm 9 as follows:

1. Verses 2-3: hymn-like opening song of thanksgiving
2. Verses 4-5: main piece of the peace song
3. Verse 6-17: transition to an eschatological hymn

In describing the structure of Psalm 9/10 there are some quite different approaches. Gunkel rated the Psalm by the alphabetical arrangement as "artificial" or "forced", saying, "One cannot place overly strict demands on the internal coherence of such a forced product. The writer was likely glad to have found a fitting word for each letter; he did not have the literary ability to mould his poem into a fully unified work of art." Anders, by contrast, calls the shape of the Psalm an elegant correspondence of form.

The French theologian Pierre Auffret gives the following structure for Psalm 9: Psalm 9:2 to 9 corresponds to Psalm 10:6 to 15:

1. in respect to the heart
2. relative to the face
3. in respect to the throne
4. in respect to the wicked
5. in respect to eternity.

Psalm 9 is the first of the acrostic Psalms, covering half of the Hebrew alphabet, with Psalm 10 covering the rest of the alphabet. There is some tension between psalms 9 and 10. Psalm 9 has a tone of victory over evil and its ancient Chaldean title suggests that it was written to celebrate David's victory over Goliath. Then, as the acrostic continues into Psalm 10, the tone becomes a lament: God seemingly stands afar off. Victory over evil may be 'here and not yet'.

== Dating ==
Some scholars question the Davidic authorship of this psalm: Bernhard Duhm and Emil Kautzsch date it to Maccabean times while form critic Hermann Gunkel links it the Persian era.

== Text ==
The following table shows the Hebrew text of the Psalm with vowels, alongside the Koine Greek text in the Septuagint and the English translation from the King James Version. Note that the meaning can slightly differ between these versions, as the Septuagint and the Masoretic Text come from different textual traditions. (Note: A 1917 translation directly from Hebrew to English by the Jewish Publication Society can be found here or here, and an 1844 translation directly from the Septuagint by L. C. L. Brenton can be found here. Both translations are in the public domain.) In the Septuagint, this is only the first half of Psalm 9, with the rest of Psalm 9 being Psalm 10 in the Masoretic text.

#	Hebrew	English	Greek
(Note: In the Jewish verse numbering, the ascription of this psalm is verse 1, and the rest of the psalm begins from verse 2. However, the Christian verse numbering does not count the ascription as a separate verse.)	לַ֭מְנַצֵּחַ עַל־מ֥וּת לַבֵּ֗ן מִזְמ֥וֹר לְדָוִֽד׃	(To the chief Musician upon Muthlabben, A Psalm of David.)	Εἰς τὸ τέλος, ὑπὲρ τῶν κρυφίων τοῦ υἱοῦ· ψαλμὸς τῷ Δαυΐδ. -
1	אוֹדֶ֣ה יְ֭הֹוָה בְּכׇל־לִבִּ֑י אֲ֝סַפְּרָ֗ה כׇּל־נִפְלְאוֹתֶֽיךָ׃	I will praise thee, O LORD, with my whole heart; I will shew forth all thy marvellous works.	ΕΞΟΜΟΛΟΓΗΣΟΜΑΙ σοι, Κύριε, ἐν ὅλῃ καρδίᾳ μου, διηγήσομαι πάντα τὰ θαυμάσιά σου·
2	אֶשְׂמְחָ֣ה וְאֶעֶלְצָ֣ה בָ֑ךְ אֲזַמְּרָ֖ה שִׁמְךָ֣ עֶלְיֽוֹן׃	I will be glad and rejoice in thee: I will sing praise to thy name, O thou most High.	εὐφρανθήσομαι καὶ ἀγαλλιάσομαι ἐν σοί, ψαλῶ τῷ ὀνόματί σου, ῞Υψιστε.
3	בְּשׁוּב־אוֹיְבַ֥י אָח֑וֹר יִכָּשְׁל֥וּ וְ֝יֹאבְד֗וּ מִפָּנֶֽיךָ׃	When mine enemies are turned back, they shall fall and perish at thy presence.	ἐν τῷ ἀποστραφῆναι τὸν ἐχθρόν μου εἰς τὰ ὀπίσω, ἀσθενήσουσι καὶ ἀπολοῦνται ἀπὸ προσώπου σου,
4	כִּֽי־עָ֭שִׂיתָ מִשְׁפָּטִ֣י וְדִינִ֑י יָשַׁ֥בְתָּ לְ֝כִסֵּ֗א שׁוֹפֵ֥ט צֶֽדֶק׃	For thou hast maintained my right and my cause; thou satest in the throne judging right.	ὅτι ἐποίησας τὴν κρίσιν μου καὶ τὴν δίκην μου, ἐκάθισας ἐπὶ θρόνου ὁ κρίνων δικαιοσύνην.
5	גָּעַ֣רְתָּ ג֭וֹיִם אִבַּ֣דְתָּ רָשָׁ֑ע שְׁמָ֥ם מָ֝חִ֗יתָ לְעוֹלָ֥ם וָעֶֽד׃	Thou hast rebuked the heathen, thou hast destroyed the wicked, thou hast put out their name for ever and ever.	ἐπετίμησας ἔθνεσι, καὶ ἀπώλετο ὁ ἀσεβής· τὸ ὄνομα αὐτοῦ ἐξήλειψας εἰς τὸν αἰῶνα καὶ εἰς τὸν αἰῶνα τοῦ αἰῶνος.
6	הָֽאוֹיֵ֨ב ׀ תַּ֥מּוּ חֳרָב֗וֹת לָ֫נֶ֥צַח וְעָרִ֥ים נָתַ֑שְׁתָּ אָבַ֖ד זִכְרָ֣ם הֵֽמָּה׃	O thou enemy, destructions are come to a perpetual end: and thou hast destroyed cities; their memorial is perished with them.	τοῦ ἐχθροῦ ἐξέλιπον αἱ ῥομφαῖαι εἰς τέλος, καὶ πόλεις καθεῖλες· ἀπώλετο τὸ μνημόσυνον αὐτοῦ μετ᾿ ἤχου,
7	וַֽ֭יהֹוָה לְעוֹלָ֣ם יֵשֵׁ֑ב כּוֹנֵ֖ן לַמִּשְׁפָּ֣ט כִּסְאֽוֹ׃	But the LORD shall endure for ever: he hath prepared his throne for judgment.	καὶ ὁ Κύριος εἰς τὸν αἰῶνα μένει. ἡτοίμασεν ἐν κρίσει τὸν θρόνον αὐτοῦ,
8	וְה֗וּא יִשְׁפֹּֽט־תֵּבֵ֥ל בְּצֶ֑דֶק יָדִ֥ין לְ֝אֻמִּ֗ים בְּמֵישָׁרִֽים׃	And he shall judge the world in righteousness, he shall minister judgment to the people in uprightness.	καὶ αὐτὸς κρινεῖ τὴν οἰκουμένην ἐν δικαιοσύνῃ, κρινεῖ λαοὺς ἐν εὐθύτητι.
9	וִ֘יהִ֤י יְהֹוָ֣ה מִשְׂגָּ֣ב לַדָּ֑ךְ מִ֝שְׂגָּ֗ב לְעִתּ֥וֹת בַּצָּרָֽה׃	The LORD also will be a refuge for the oppressed, a refuge in times of trouble.	καὶ ἐγένετο Κύριος καταφυγὴ τῷ πένητι, βοηθὸς ἐν εὐκαιρίαις ἐν θλίψεσι·
10	וְיִבְטְח֣וּ בְ֭ךָ יוֹדְעֵ֣י שְׁמֶ֑ךָ כִּ֤י לֹֽא־עָזַ֖בְתָּ דֹרְשֶׁ֣יךָ יְהֹוָֽה׃	And they that know thy name will put their trust in thee: for thou, LORD, hast not forsaken them that seek thee.	καὶ ἐλπισάτωσαν ἐπὶ σοὶ οἱ γινώσκοντες τὸ ὄνομά σου, ὅτι οὐκ ἐγκατέλιπες τοὺς ἐκζητοῦντάς σε, Κύριε.
11	זַמְּר֗וּ לַ֭יהֹוָה יֹשֵׁ֣ב צִיּ֑וֹן הַגִּ֥ידוּ בָ֝עַמִּ֗ים עֲלִֽילוֹתָֽיו׃	Sing praises to the LORD, which dwelleth in Zion: declare among the people his doings.	ψάλατε τῷ Κυρίῳ, τῷ κατοικοῦντι ἐν Σιών, ἀναγγείλατε ἐν τοῖς ἔθνεσι τὰ ἐπιτηδεύματα αὐτοῦ,
12	כִּֽי־דֹרֵ֣שׁ דָּ֭מִים אוֹתָ֣ם זָכָ֑ר לֹֽא־שָׁ֝כַ֗ח צַעֲקַ֥ת (עניים) [עֲנָוִֽים]׃	When he maketh inquisition for blood, he remembereth them: he forgetteth not the cry of the humble.	ὅτι ἐκζητῶν τὰ αἵματα αὐτῶν ἐμνήσθη, οὐκ ἐπελάθετο τῆς κραυγῆς τῶν πενήτων.
13	חָֽנְנֵ֬נִי יְהֹוָ֗ה רְאֵ֣ה עׇ֭נְיִי מִשֹּׂנְאָ֑י מְ֝רוֹמְמִ֗י מִשַּׁ֥עֲרֵי מָֽוֶת׃	Have mercy upon me, O LORD; consider my trouble which I suffer of them that hate me, thou that liftest me up from the gates of death:	ἐλέησόν με, Κύριε, ἴδε τὴν ταπείνωσίν μου ἐκ τῶν ἐχθρῶν μου, ὁ ὑψῶν με ἐκ τῶν πυλῶν τοῦ θανάτου,
14	לְמַ֥עַן אֲסַפְּרָ֗ה כׇּֽל־תְּהִלָּ֫תֶ֥יךָ בְּשַׁעֲרֵ֥י בַת־צִיּ֑וֹן אָ֝גִ֗ילָה בִּישֽׁוּעָתֶֽךָ׃	That I may shew forth all thy praise in the gates of the daughter of Zion: I will rejoice in thy salvation.	ὅπως ἂν ἐξαγγείλω πάσας τὰς αἰνέσεις σου ἐν ταῖς πύλαις τῆς θυγατρὸς Σιών. ἀγαλλιάσομαι ἐπὶ τῷ σωτηρίῳ σου.
15	טָבְע֣וּ ג֭וֹיִם בְּשַׁ֣חַת עָשׂ֑וּ בְּרֶֽשֶׁת־ז֥וּ טָ֝מָ֗נוּ נִלְכְּדָ֥ה רַגְלָֽם׃	The heathen are sunk down in the pit that they made: in the net which they hid is their own foot taken.	ἐνεπάγησαν ἔθνη ἐν διαφθορᾷ, ᾗ ἐποίησαν, ἐν παγίδι ταύτῃ, ᾗ ἔκρυψαν, συνελήφθη ὁ ποὺς αὐτῶν.
16	נ֤וֹדַ֨ע ׀ יְהֹוָה֮ מִשְׁפָּ֢ט עָ֫שָׂ֥ה בְּפֹ֣עַל כַּ֭פָּיו נוֹקֵ֣שׁ רָשָׁ֑ע הִגָּי֥וֹן סֶֽלָה׃	The LORD is known by the judgment which he executeth: the wicked is snared in the work of his own hands. Higgaion. Selah.	γινώσκεται Κύριος κρίματα ποιῶν, ἐν τοῖς ἔργοις τῶν χειρῶν αὐτοῦ συνελήφθη ὁ ἁμαρτωλός. (ᾠδὴ διαψάλματος).
17	יָשׁ֣וּבוּ רְשָׁעִ֣ים לִשְׁא֑וֹלָה כׇּל־גּ֝וֹיִ֗ם שְׁכֵחֵ֥י אֱלֹהִֽים׃	The wicked shall be turned into hell, and all the nations that forget God.	ἀποστραφήτωσαν οἱ ἁμαρτωλοὶ εἰς τὸν ᾅδην, πάντα τὰ ἔθνη τὰ ἐπιλανθανόμενα τοῦ Θεοῦ,
18	כִּ֤י לֹ֣א לָ֭נֶצַח יִשָּׁכַ֣ח אֶבְי֑וֹן תִּקְוַ֥ת (ענוים) [עֲ֝נִיִּ֗ים] תֹּאבַ֥ד לָעַֽד׃	For the needy shall not always be forgotten: the expectation of the poor shall not perish for ever.	ὅτι οὐκ εἰς τέλος ἐπιλησθήσεται ὁ πτωχός, ἡ ὑπομονὴ τῶν πενήτων οὐκ ἀπολεῖται εἰς τέλος.
19	קוּמָ֣ה יְ֭הֹוָה אַל־יָעֹ֣ז אֱנ֑וֹשׁ יִשָּׁפְט֥וּ ג֝וֹיִ֗ם עַל־פָּנֶֽיךָ׃	Arise, O LORD; let not man prevail: let the heathen be judged in thy sight.	ἀνάστηθι, Κύριε, μὴ κραταιούσθω ἄνθρωπος, κριθήτωσαν ἔθνη ἐνώπιόν σου.
20	שִׁ֘יתָ֤ה יְהֹוָ֨ה ׀ מוֹרָ֗ה לָ֫הֶ֥ם יֵדְע֥וּ גוֹיִ֑ם אֱנ֖וֹשׁ הֵ֣מָּה סֶּֽלָה׃	Put them in fear, O LORD: that the nations may know themselves to be but men. Selah.	κατάστησον, Κύριε, νομοθέτην ἐπ᾿ αὐτούς, γνώτωσαν ἔθνη ὅτι ἄνθρωποί εἰσιν. (διάψαλμα).

== Uses ==
=== Judaism ===
- Verse 4 is found in the repetition of the Amidah on Rosh Hashanah.
- Verse 11 is part of Uva Letzion.
- Verse 13 is part of Av Harachamim.

=== Catholic Church ===
According to the Rule of St. Benedict (530 AD), Psalm 1 to Psalm 20 were mainly reserved for the office of Prime. In the Rule of St. Benedict, Psalm 9 is sung by the Latin version translated in the Greek of the Septuagint; therein, Psalm includes 18 additional verses in Psalm 10. Benedict divided this joint Psalm 9/10 in two parts, one sung to the end of the office of Prime Tuesday (Psalm 9: 1–19) and the other (Psalm 9: 20–21 and Psalm 10: 1–18) earlier on Wednesdays. In other words, the first verses of Psalm 9 until Quoniam non in finem erit oblivio pauperis: patientia pauperum non peribit in finem, formed the third and final psalm on Tuesday, the second part of the Psalm (Vulgate according to his view) was recited as the first psalm of the office of the prime Wednesday.

Psalms 9 and 10 were traditionally recited as the fourth and fifth Psalms of Sunday Matins in the Liturgy of non monks clerics and canons. In the current Liturgy of the Hours, Psalm 9 is sung in the Office of Readings for Monday of the first week of the four weekly cycle of liturgical prayers.

=== Book of Common Prayer ===
In the Church of England's Book of Common Prayer, this psalm is appointed to be read on the evening of the first day of the month.

== Musical settings ==
The French hymn and its German translation, "Ich lobe meinen Gott von ganzem Herzen", are a paraphrase of verses from Psalm 9.

Heinrich Schütz wrote a setting of a paraphrase in German, "Mit fröhlichem Gemüte", SWV 105, for the Becker Psalter, published first in 1628.

François Giroust wrote a grand motet in 1767.

== Illuminated manuscripts ==
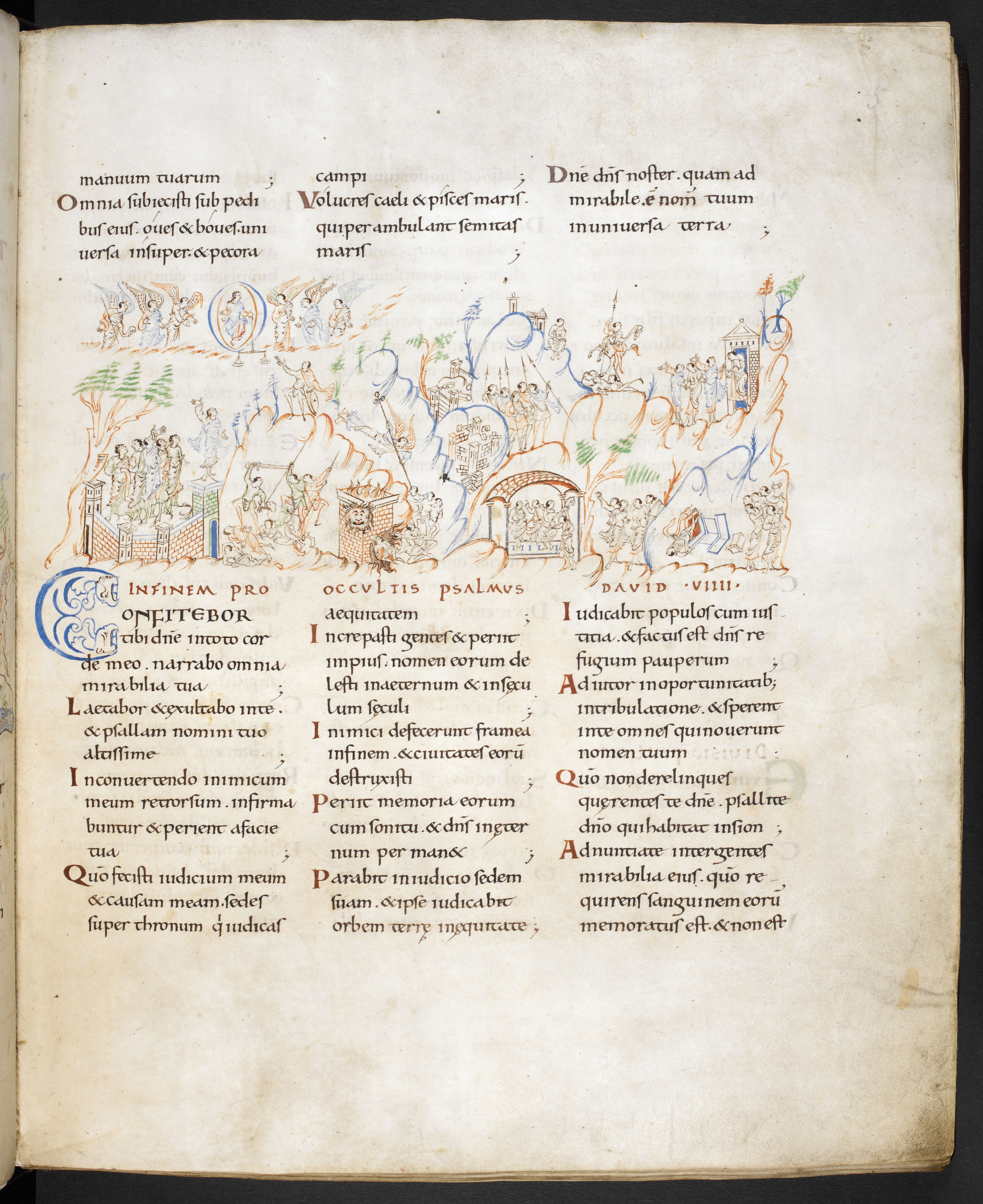
Harley Psalter

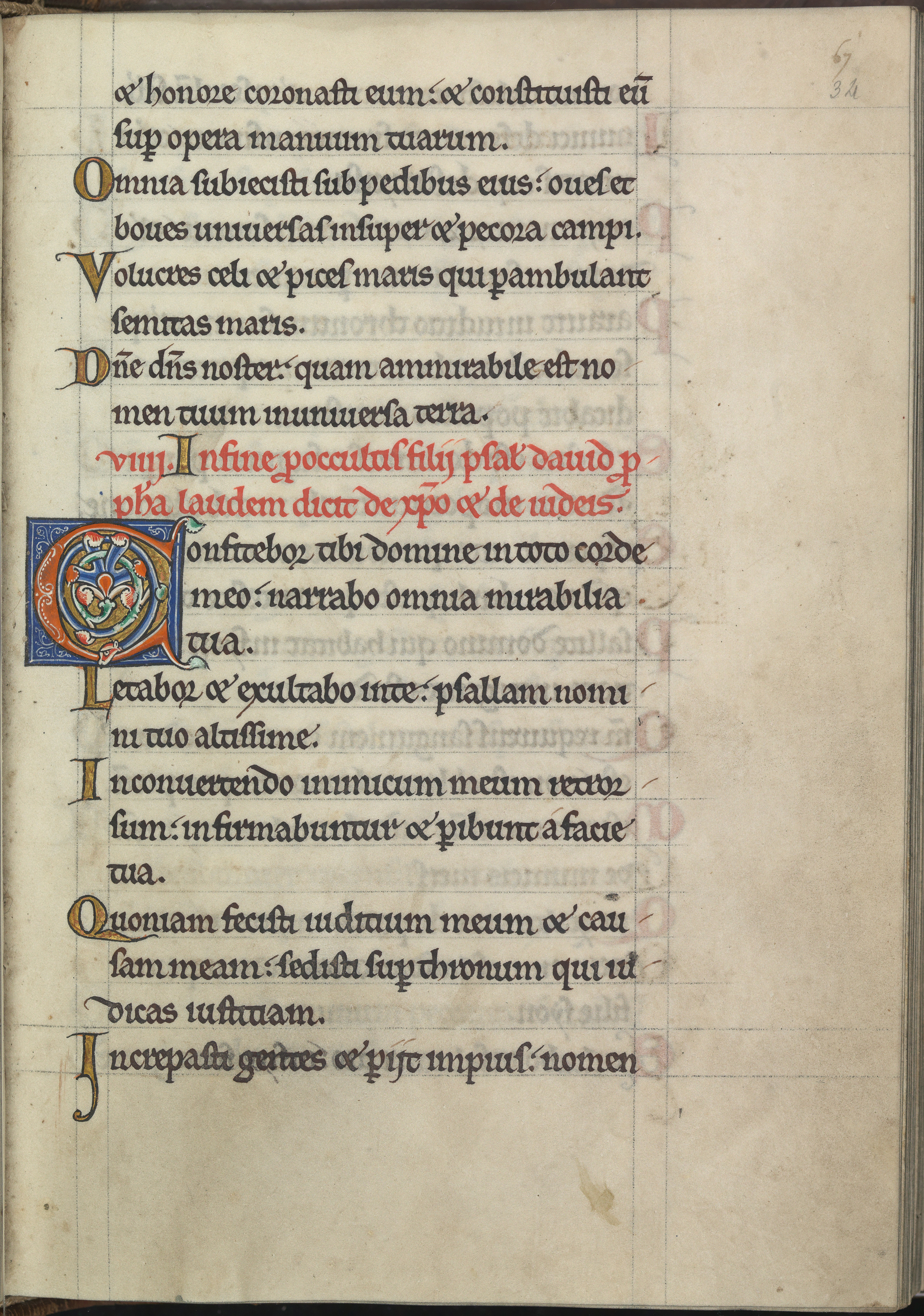
Fécamp Psalter

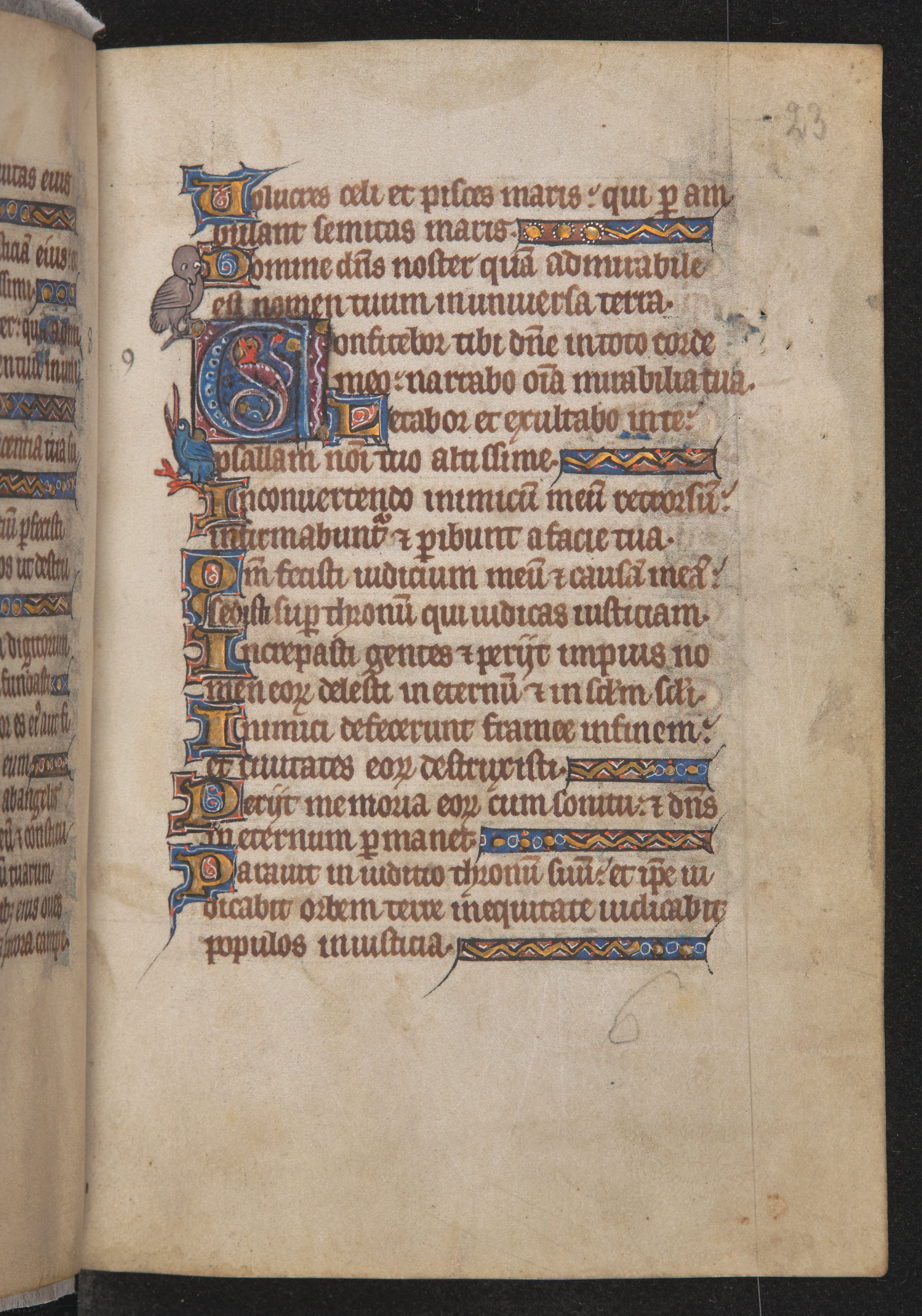
A 14th-century French psalter
