= Psalm 10 =

Biblical psalm

- "Why standest thou afar off, O LORD?"
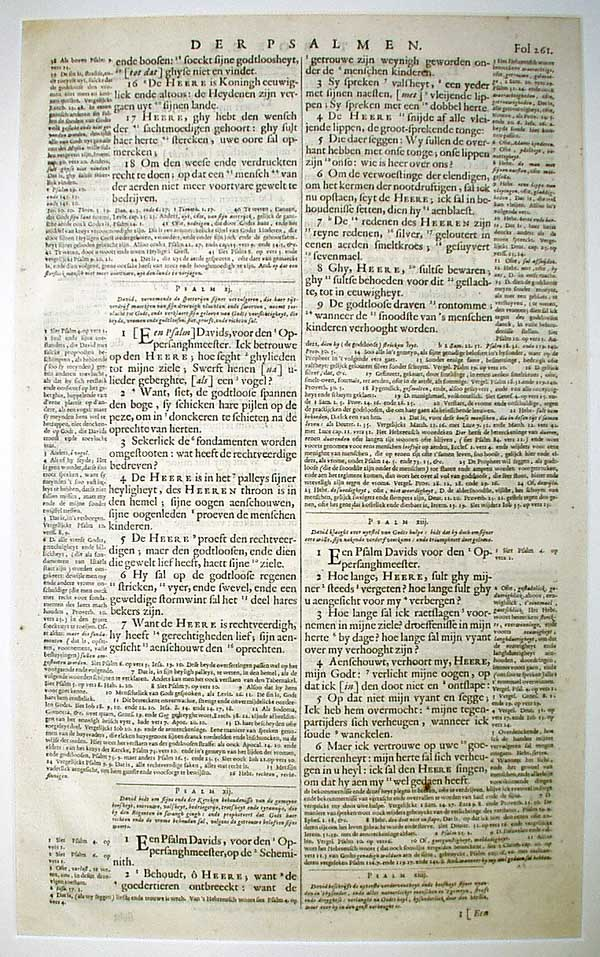
- End of Psalm 10 in the 9th-century Elzevir Bible
- Other name: Psalm 9b; "Ut quid Domine recessisti"
- Text: by David
- Language: Hebrew (original)

Psalm 10
- ← Psalm 9 Psalm 11 →
- Book: Book of Psalms
- Hebrew Bible part: Ketuvim
- Order in the Hebrew part: 1
- Category: Sifrei Emet
- Christian Bible part: Old Testament
- Order in the Christian part: 19

Psalm 10 is the tenth psalm of the Book of Psalms, beginning in English in the King James Version: "Why standest thou afar off, O LORD? why hidest thou thyself in times of trouble?" In the Greek Septuagint and the Latin Vulgate, it is not an individual psalm but the second part of psalm 9, "Ut quid Domine recessisti". These two consecutive psalms have the form of a single acrostic Hebrew poem. Compared to Psalm 9, Psalm 10 is focused more on the individual than the collective human condition.

The psalm forms a regular part of Jewish, Catholic, Lutheran, Anglican and other Protestant liturgies.

== Context ==
Psalm 8 reflects on man's special place in creation. In contrast, both psalms 9 and 10 will end with statements setting mankind in a more negative light in the final verses of each. Psalm 9 closes with the phase "Put them in fear, O Lord: that the nations may know themselves to be but men, selah" Psalm 9:20 and Psalm 10:18 closes Psalm 10 with "...that the man of the earth may no more oppress." Some speculate that the final word of Psalm 9, selah, possibly meaning "a pause", might link the two psalms 9 and 10 together.

Taken together, Psalms 9 and 10 comprise a continuous acrostic psalm in the Hebrew alphabet. Some texts, such as the Septuagint, combine them. They also contrast as Psalm 9 is more victorious and 10 more of a lament.

== Text ==
The following table shows the Hebrew text of the Psalm with vowels, alongside the Koine Greek text in the Septuagint and the English translation from the King James Version. Note that the meaning can slightly differ between these versions, as the Septuagint and the Masoretic Text come from different textual traditions. (Note: A 1917 translation directly from Hebrew to English by the Jewish Publication Society can be found here or here, and an 1844 translation directly from the Septuagint by L. C. L. Brenton can be found here. Both translations are in the public domain.) In the Septuagint, this is not a separate psalm, but the second half of Psalm 9.

#	Hebrew	English	Greek
1	לָמָ֣ה יְ֭הֹוָה תַּֽעֲמֹ֣ד בְּרָח֑וֹק תַּ֝עְלִ֗ים לְעִתּ֥וֹת בַּצָּרָֽה׃	Why standest thou afar off, O LORD? why hidest thou thyself in times of trouble?	῾Ινατί, Κύριε, ἀφέστηκας μακρόθεν, ὑπερορᾷς ἐν εὐκαιρίαις ἐν θλίψεσιν;
2	בְּגַאֲוַ֣ת רָ֭שָׁע יִדְלַ֣ק עָנִ֑י יִתָּֽפְשׂ֓וּ ׀ בִּמְזִמּ֖וֹת ז֣וּ חָשָֽׁבוּ׃	The wicked in his pride doth persecute the poor: let them be taken in the devices that they have imagined.	ἐν τῷ ὑπερηφανεύεσθαι τὸν ἀσεβῆ ἐμπυρίζεται ὁ πτωχός, συλλαμβάνονται ἐν διαβουλίοις, οἷς διαλογίζονται.
3	כִּֽי־הִלֵּ֣ל רָ֭שָׁע עַל־תַּאֲוַ֣ת נַפְשׁ֑וֹ וּבֹצֵ֥עַ בֵּ֝רֵ֗ךְ נִ֘אֵ֥ץ ׀ יְהֹוָֽה׃	For the wicked boasteth of his heart's desire, and blesseth the covetous, whom the LORD abhorreth.	ὅτι ἐπαινεῖται ὁ ἁμαρτωλὸς ἐν ταῖς ἐπιθυμίαις τῆς ψυχῆς αὐτοῦ, καὶ ὁ ἀδικῶν ἐνευλογεῖται·
4	רָשָׁ֗ע כְּגֹ֣בַהּ אַ֭פּוֹ בַּל־יִדְרֹ֑שׁ אֵ֥ין אֱ֝לֹהִ֗ים כׇּל־מְזִמּוֹתָֽיו׃	The wicked, through the pride of his countenance, will not seek after God: God is not in all his thoughts.	παρώξυνε τὸν Κύριον ὁ ἁμαρτωλός· κατὰ τὸ πλῆθος τῆς ὀργῆς αὐτοῦ οὐκ ἐκζητήσει· οὐκ ἔστιν ὁ Θεὸς ἐνώπιον αὐτοῦ.
5	יָ֘חִ֤ילוּ דְרָכָ֨ו ׀ בְּכׇל־עֵ֗ת מָר֣וֹם מִ֭שְׁפָּטֶיךָ מִנֶּגְדּ֑וֹ כׇּל־צ֝וֹרְרָ֗יו יָפִ֥יחַ בָּהֶֽם׃	His ways are always grievous; thy judgments are far above out of his sight: as for all his enemies, he puffeth at them.	βεβηλοῦνται αἱ ὁδοὶ αὐτοῦ ἐν παντὶ καιρῷ, ἀνταναιρεῖται τὰ κρίματά σου ἀπὸ προσώπου αὐτοῦ, πάντων τῶν ἐχθρῶν αὐτοῦ κατακυριεύσει·
6	אָמַ֣ר בְּ֭לִבּוֹ בַּל־אֶמּ֑וֹט לְדֹ֥ר וָ֝דֹ֗ר אֲשֶׁ֣ר לֹֽא־בְרָֽע׃	He hath said in his heart, I shall not be moved: for I shall never be in adversity.	εἶπε γὰρ ἐν καρδίᾳ αὐτοῦ· οὐ μὴ σαλευθῶ, ἀπὸ γενεᾶς εἰς γενεὰν ἄνευ κακοῦ.
7	אָלָ֤ה ׀ פִּ֣יהוּ מָ֭לֵא וּמִרְמ֣וֹת וָתֹ֑ךְ תַּ֥חַת לְ֝שׁוֹנ֗וֹ עָמָ֥ל וָאָֽוֶן׃	His mouth is full of cursing and deceit and fraud: under his tongue is mischief and vanity.	οὗ ἀρᾶς τὸ στόμα αὐτοῦ γέμει καὶ πικρίας καὶ δόλου, ὑπὸ τὴν γλῶσσαν αὐτοῦ κόπος καὶ πόνος.
8	יֵשֵׁ֤ב ׀ בְּמַאְרַ֬ב חֲצֵרִ֗ים בַּֽ֭מִּסְתָּרִים יַהֲרֹ֣ג נָקִ֑י עֵ֝ינָ֗יו לְֽחֵלְכָ֥ה יִצְפֹּֽנוּ׃	He sitteth in the lurking places of the villages: in the secret places doth he murder the innocent: his eyes are privily set against the poor.	ἐγκάθηται ἐνέδρᾳ μετὰ πλουσίων, ἐν ἀποκρύφοις τοῦ ἀποκτεῖναι ἀθῷον· οἱ ὀφθαλμοὶ αὐτοῦ εἰς τὸν πένητα ἀποβλέπουσιν·
9	יֶאֱרֹ֬ב בַּמִּסְתָּ֨ר ׀ כְּאַרְיֵ֬ה בְסֻכֹּ֗ה יֶ֭אֱרֹב לַחֲט֣וֹף עָנִ֑י יַחְטֹ֥ף עָ֝נִ֗י בְּמׇשְׁכ֥וֹ בְרִשְׁתּֽוֹ׃	He lieth in wait secretly as a lion in his den: he lieth in wait to catch the poor: he doth catch the poor, when he draweth him into his net.	ἐνεδρεύει ἐν ἀποκρύφῳ ὡς λέων ἐν τῇ μάνδρᾳ αὐτοῦ, ἐνεδρεύει τοῦ ἁρπάσαι πτωχόν, ἁρπάσαι πτωχὸν ἐν τῷ ἑλκύσαι αὐτόν·
10	(ודכה) [יִדְכֶּ֥ה] יָשֹׁ֑חַ וְנָפַ֥ל בַּ֝עֲצוּמָ֗יו (חלכאים) [חֵ֣ל כָּאִֽים]׃	He croucheth, and humbleth himself, that the poor may fall by his strong ones.	ἐν τῇ παγίδι αὐτοῦ ταπεινώσει αὐτόν, κύψει καὶ πεσεῖται ἐν τῷ αὐτὸν κατακυριεῦσαι τῶν πενήτων.
11	אָמַ֣ר בְּ֭לִבּוֹ שָׁ֣כַֽח אֵ֑ל הִסְתִּ֥יר פָּ֝נָ֗יו בַּל־רָאָ֥ה לָנֶֽצַח׃	He hath said in his heart, God hath forgotten: he hideth his face; he will never see it.	εἶπε γὰρ ἐν καρδίᾳ αὐτοῦ· ἐπιλέλησται ὁ Θεός, ἀπέστρεψε τὸ πρόσωπον αὐτοῦ τοῦ μὴ βλέπειν εἰς τέλος.
12	קוּמָ֤ה יְהֹוָ֗ה אֵ֭ל נְשָׂ֣א יָדֶ֑ךָ אַל־תִּשְׁכַּ֥ח (עניים) [עֲנָוִֽים]׃	Arise, O LORD; O God, lift up thine hand: forget not the humble.	ἀνάστηθι, Κύριε ὁ Θεός μου, ὑψωθήτω ἡ χείρ σου, μὴ ἐπιλάθῃ τῶν πενήτων.
13	עַל־מֶ֤ה ׀ נִאֵ֖ץ רָשָׁ֥ע ׀ אֱלֹהִ֑ים אָמַ֥ר בְּ֝לִבּ֗וֹ לֹ֣א תִדְרֹֽשׁ׃	Wherefore doth the wicked contemn God? he hath said in his heart, Thou wilt not require it.	ἕνεκεν τίνος παρώργισεν ὁ ἀσεβὴς τὸν Θεόν; εἶπε γὰρ ἐν καρδίᾳ αὐτοῦ· οὐκ ἐκζητήσει.
14	רָאִ֡תָה כִּי־אַתָּ֤ה ׀ עָ֘מָ֤ל וָכַ֨עַס ׀ תַּבִּיט֮ לָתֵ֢ת בְּיָ֫דֶ֥ךָ עָ֭לֶיךָ יַעֲזֹ֣ב חֵלֵ֑כָה יָ֝ת֗וֹם אַתָּ֤ה ׀ הָיִ֬יתָ עוֹזֵֽר׃	Thou hast seen it; for thou beholdest mischief and spite, to requite it with thy hand: the poor committeth himself unto thee; thou art the helper of the fatherless.	βλέπεις, ὅτι σὺ πόνον καὶ θυμὸν κατανοεῖς τοῦ παραδοῦναι αὐτοὺς εἰς χεῖράς σου· σοὶ ἐγκαταλέλειπται ὁ πτωχός, ὀρφανῷ σὺ ᾖσθα βοηθός.
15	שְׁ֭בֹר זְר֣וֹעַ רָשָׁ֑ע וָ֝רָ֗ע תִּֽדְרוֹשׁ־רִשְׁע֥וֹ בַל־תִּמְצָֽא׃	Break thou the arm of the wicked and the evil man: seek out his wickedness till thou find none.	σύντριψον τὸν βραχίονα τοῦ ἁμαρτωλοῦ καὶ πονηροῦ, ζητηθήσεται ἡ ἁμαρτία αὐτοῦ, καὶ οὐ μὴ εὑρεθῇ.
16	יְהֹוָ֣ה מֶ֭לֶךְ עוֹלָ֣ם וָעֶ֑ד אָבְד֥וּ ג֝וֹיִ֗ם מֵאַרְצֽוֹ׃	The LORD is King for ever and ever: the heathen are perished out of his land.	βασιλεύσει Κύριος εἰς τὸν αἰῶνα καὶ εἰς τὸν αἰῶνα τοῦ αἰῶνος, ἀπολεῖσθε ἔθνη ἐκ τῆς γῆς αὐτοῦ.
17	תַּאֲוַ֬ת עֲנָוִ֣ים שָׁמַ֣עְתָּ יְהֹוָ֑ה תָּכִ֥ין לִ֝בָּ֗ם תַּקְשִׁ֥יב אׇזְנֶֽךָ׃	LORD, thou hast heard the desire of the humble: thou wilt prepare their heart, thou wilt cause thine ear to hear:	τὴν ἐπιθυμίαν τῶν πενήτων εἰσήκουσε Κύριος, τὴν ἑτοιμασίαν τῆς καρδίας αὐτῶν προσέσχε τὸ οὖς σου
18	לִשְׁפֹּ֥ט יָת֗וֹם וָ֫דָ֥ךְ בַּל־יוֹסִ֥יף ע֑וֹד לַעֲרֹ֥ץ אֱ֝נ֗וֹשׁ מִן־הָאָֽרֶץ׃	To judge the fatherless and the oppressed, that the man of the earth may no more oppress.	κρῖναι ὀρφανῷ καὶ ταπεινῷ, ἵνα μὴ προσθῇ ἔτι μεγαλαυχεῖν ἄνθρωπος ἐπὶ τῆς γῆς.

== Uses ==
=== Judaism ===
- This psalm is recited during the Ten Days of Repentance in some traditions.
- Verse 16 forms parts of the eighth and ninth verses of Yehi Kivod in Pesukei Dezimra, part of Baruch Hashem L'Olam in Maariv, and part of the Bedtime Shema.
- Verse 17 is found in the repetition of the Amidah during Rosh Hashanah.

=== New Testament ===
- Verses 7 is quoted in Romans 3:14

=== Catholic Church ===
According to the Rule of St. Benedict (530 AD), Psalm 1 to Psalm 20 were mainly reserved for the Office of Prime. Psalm 9 is sung in the Latin version translated from the Greek Septuagint, and therefore includes Psalm 10, as noted above. Benedict had divided this Psalm 9/10 in two parts, one sung to the end of the Office of Prime Tuesday (Psalm 9: 1–19) and the other (Psalm 9: 20–21 and Psalm 10: 1–18) is the first of the three readings on Wednesday. In other words, the first verses of Psalm 9 until "Quoniam non in finem erit oblivio pauperis: patientia pauperum non peribit in finem," formed the third and final Prime Psalm from Tuesday, the second part of the Psalm (Vulgate according to his view) was recited as the first psalm of the Office of Prime Wednesday.

Traditionally Psalms 9 and 10 were recited as the seventh Psalms of Sunday Matins.

=== Book of Common Prayer ===
In the Church of England's Book of Common Prayer, this psalm is appointed to be read on the morning of the second day of the month.

== Musical settings ==
Heinrich Schütz wrote a setting of a paraphrase of Psalm 10 in German, "Wie meinst du's doch, ach Herr, mein Gott", SWV 106, for the Becker Psalter, published first in 1628.
