= Jewish holidays =

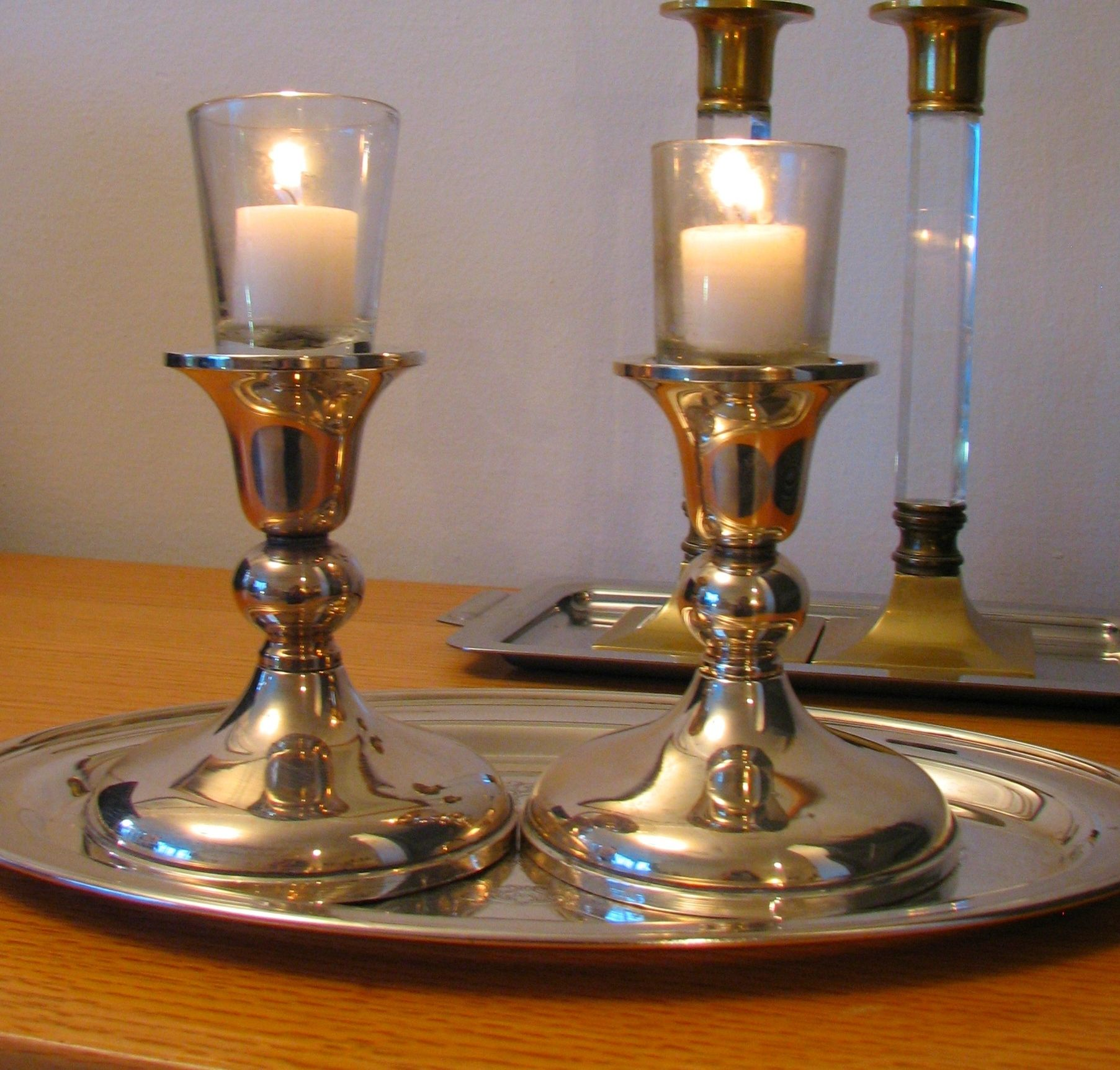
Candles are lit on the eve of the Jewish Sabbath ("Shabbat") and on Jewish holidays.

Jewish holidays, also known as Jewish festivals or Yamim Tovim (Hebrew: יָמִים טוֹבִים, romanized: yāmīm ṭōvīm, lit. 'Good Days', or singular Hebrew: יוֹם טוֹב Yom Tov, in transliterated Hebrew [English: /ˈjɔːm ˈtɔːv, joʊm ˈtoʊv/]), are holidays observed by Jews throughout the Hebrew calendar. (Note: This article focuses on practices of mainstream Rabbinic Judaism. Karaite Jews and Samaritans also observe the biblical festivals, but not in an identical fashion and not always at exactly the same time.) They include religious, cultural and national elements, derived from four sources: mitzvot ("biblical commandments"), rabbinic mandates, the history of Judaism, and the State of Israel.

Jewish holidays occur on the same dates every year in the Hebrew calendar, but the dates vary in the Gregorian. This is because the Hebrew calendar is a lunisolar calendar (based on the cycles of both the sun and moon), whereas the Gregorian is a solar calendar. Each holiday can only occur on certain days of the week, four for most, but five for holidays in Tevet and Shevat and six for Hanukkah (see Days of week on Hebrew calendar).

Date ranges for Jewish holidays
Holiday	Date range
Rosh Hashanah	5 Sep to 5 Oct
Yom Kippur	14 Sep to 14 Oct
Sukkot (first of seven days)	19 Sep to 19 Oct
Shemini Atzeret	26 Sep to 26 Oct
Simchat Torah	27 Sep to 27 Oct
Hanukkah (first of eight days)	28 Nov to 27 Dec
Tu Bishvat	15 Jan to 13 Feb
Purim	24 Feb to 26 Mar
Shushan Purim	25 Feb to 27 Mar
Pesach (first of seven/eight days)	26 Mar to 25 Apr
Yom HaShoah	8 Apr to 7 May
Yom Ha'atzmaut	15 Apr to 15 May
Lag B'Omer	28 Apr to 28 May
Yom Yerushalayim	8 May to 7 Jun
Shavuot	15 May to 14 Jun
Tzom Tammuz	25 Jun to 25 Jul
Tisha B'Av	16 Jul to 15 Aug
Tu B'Av	22 Jul to 21 Aug

== General concepts ==
=== Groupings ===
Certain terms are used very commonly for groups of holidays.

- The Hebrew-language term Yom Tov (Hebrew: יום טוב), sometimes referred to as "festival day", usually refers to the six biblically mandated festival dates on which all activities prohibited on Shabbat are prohibited, except for some related to food preparation. These include the first and seventh days of Passover (the Feast of Unleavened Bread / the Feast of Matzot – Exodus 23:15, Deuteronomy 16:16), [first day of] Shavuot, both days of Rosh Hashanah, first day of Sukkot, and [first day of] Shemini Atzeret. By extension, outside the Land of Israel, the second-day holidays known under the rubric Yom tov sheni shel galuyot (literally, "Second Yom Tov of the Diaspora")—including Simchat Torah—are also included in this grouping. Colloquially, Yom Kippur, a biblically mandated date on which even food preparation is prohibited, is often included in this grouping. The tradition of keeping two days of Yom Tov in the diaspora has existed since roughly 300 BCE.
- The English-language term High Holy Days or High Holidays refers to Rosh Hashanah and Yom Kippur collectively. Its Hebrew analogue, "Days of Awe" (Hebrew: ימים נוראים), is more flexible: it can refer just to those holidays, or to the Ten Days of Repentance, or the entire penitential period, starting as early as the beginning of Elul, and (more rarely) ending as late as Shemini Atzeret.
- The term Three Pilgrimage Festivals (Hebrew: שלוש רגלים, romanized: shalosh rəġalim or Hebrew: חגים ḥaġim) refers to Passover (the Feast of Unleavened Bread / Feast of Matzot), Shavuot and Sukkot. Within this grouping, Sukkot normally includes Shemini Atzeret and Simchat Torah.
- Ma'agal Hashana (Hebrew: מעגל השנה, romanized: maʿgal haš-šānā; "year cycle"), a more general term, is often used – especially in educational settings – to refer to the overall study of the Jewish calendar, outlining the month by month events, with mitzvot and minhagim, and philosophical material, that occur over the year.

=== Terminology used to describe holidays ===
Certain terminology is used in referring to different categories of holidays, depending on their source and their nature:

Shabbat (Hebrew: שבת) (Ashkenazi pron. from Yiddish shabbos), or Sabbath, is referred to by that name exclusively. Similarly, Rosh Chodesh (Hebrew: ראש חודש) is referred to by that name exclusively.

- Yom tov (Hebrew: יום טוב) (Ashkenazi pron. from Yid. yontif) (lit., "good day"): See "Groupings" above.
- Moed (Hebrew: מועד) ("festive season"), plural moadim (Hebrew: מועדים), refers to any of the Three Pilgrimage Festivals of Passover, Shavuot and Sukkot. When used in comparison to Yom Tov, it refers to Chol HaMoed, the intermediate days of Passover and Sukkot.
- Ḥag or chag (Hebrew: חג) ("festival"), plural chagim (Hebrew: חגים), can be used whenever yom tov or moed is. It is also used to describe Hanukkah and Purim, as well as Yom Ha'atzmaut (Israeli Independence Day) and Yom Yerushalayim (Jerusalem Day).
- Ta'anit (Hebrew: תענית), or, less commonly, tzom (Hebrew: צום), refers to a fast. These terms are generally used to describe the rabbinic fasts, although tzom is used liturgically to refer to Yom Kippur as well.

=== "Work" on Sabbath and biblical holidays ===
The most notable common feature of Shabbat and the biblical festivals is the requirement to refrain from the 39 Melakhot on these days. (Note: This "negative" (refraining) requirement is paired with a positive requirement to honor and enjoy the Sabbath or festival day. For information on the positive requirements, see Shabbat: Rituals and Shabbat: Encouraged activities.) Melakha is most commonly translated as "work"; perhaps a better translation is "creative-constructive work". Strictly speaking, melakha is defined in halakha (Jewish law) by 39 categories of labor that were used in constructing the Tabernacle while the Jews wandered in the desert. As understood traditionally and in Orthodox Judaism:

- On Shabbat and Yom Kippur all melakha is prohibited.
- On a holiday other than Yom Kippur which falls on a weekday, not Shabbat, most melakha is prohibited. Some melacha related to the preparation of food is permitted. (Note: Carrying items needed for the holiday in a public domain—more technically, transferring items between domains—is considered to be a melacha related to food preparation.) (Note: Burials are also permitted on a yom tov, although not on Shabbat nor Yom Kippur. On the first day of yom tov, burial is prohibited unless the bulk of the associated melacha is done by non-Jews. On the second day of yom tov, including Rosh Hashanah, burial is permitted even if the bulk of the associated melacha is done by Jews. In modern times, it is extremely unusual for a yom tov burial to occur, except on the second day of Rosh Hashanah in Jerusalem. Further details are beyond the scope of this article.)
- On weekdays during Chol HaMoed, melakha is not prohibited per se. However, melakha should be limited to that required either to enhance the enjoyment of the remainder of the festival or to avoid great financial loss, or several other categories.
- On other days, there are no restrictions on melakha. (Note: There is a practice for women to refrain from some types of labor on Rosh Chodesh; see Rosh Chodesh and women.)

In principle, Conservative Judaism understands the requirement to refrain from melakha in the same way as Orthodox Judaism. In practice, Conservative rabbis frequently rule on prohibitions around melakha differently from Orthodox authorities. Still, there are some Conservative/Masorti communities around the world where Shabbat and festival observance fairly closely resembles Orthodox observance. (Note: This is especially, though not exclusively, true outside the US. For example, Masorti Judaism in Israel and the UK rejects North American Conservatism's position to permit driving to synagogue on Shabbat.)

However, many, if not most, lay members of Conservative congregations in North America do not consider themselves Shabbat observant, even by Conservative standards. At the same time, adherents of Reform Judaism and Reconstructionist Judaism do not accept traditional halakha, and therefore restrictions on melakha, as binding at all. (Note: See, for example, Reform Judaism's Position on Jewish Law and Reconstructionist Judaism (Jewish Law and Tradition), and references in those articles.) Jews fitting any of these descriptions refrain from melakha in practice only as they see fit.

Shabbat and holiday work restrictions are always put aside in cases of pikuach nefesh, which are actions to save a human life. At the most fundamental level, if there is any possibility whatsoever that action must be taken to save a life, Shabbat restrictions are set aside immediately, and without reservation. (Note: The Babylonian Talmud (see at Sotah 20–21) describes one who fails to do so as a chasid shoteh, a foolishly pious individual.) Where the danger to life is present but less immediate, there is some preference to minimize violation of Shabbat work restrictions where possible. The laws in this area are complex.

=== Second day of biblical festivals ===
The Torah specifies a single date on the Jewish calendar for observance of holidays. Nevertheless, festivals of biblical origin other than Shabbat and Yom Kippur are observed for two days outside the land of Israel, and Rosh Hashanah is observed for two days even inside the land of Israel.

Dates for holidays on the Jewish calendar are expressed in the Torah as "day x of month y". Accordingly, the beginning of month y needs to be determined before the proper date of the holiday on day x can be fixed. Months in the Jewish calendar are lunar, and originally were thought to have been proclaimed by the blowing of a shofar. Later, the Sanhedrin received testimony of witnesses saying they saw the new crescent moon. (Note: Similar practices are still used in Islam as well as in the Karaite and Samaritan communities.) Then the Sanhedrin would inform Jewish communities away from its meeting place that it had proclaimed a new moon. The practice of observing a second festival day stemmed from delays in disseminating that information.

- Rosh Hashanah. Because of holiday restrictions on travel, messengers could not even leave the seat of the Sanhedrin until the holiday was over. Inherently, there was no possible way for anyone living away from the seat of the Sanhedrin to receive news of the proclamation of the new month until messengers arrived after the fact. Accordingly, the practice emerged that Rosh Hashanah was observed on both possible days, as calculated from the previous month's start, everywhere in the world. (Note: This reasoning did not directly apply in the actual meeting place of the Sanhedrin, but there are other reasons that the practice was applied there as well. See Rambam, Mishnah Torah, Kiddush HaChodesh 5:8.)
- Three Pilgrimage Festivals. Sukkot and Passover fall on the 15th day of their respective months. This gave messengers two weeks to inform communities about the proclamation of the new month. Normally, they would reach most communities within the land of Israel within that time, but they might fail to reach communities farther away (such as those in Babylonia or overseas). Consequently, the practice developed that these holidays be observed for one day within Israel, but for two days (both possible days as calculated from the previous month's start) outside Israel. This practice is known as yom tov sheni shel galuyot, "second day of festivals in exile communities".

For Shavuot, calculated as the fiftieth day from Passover, the above issue did not pertain directly, as the "correct" date for Passover would be known by then. Nevertheless, the Talmud applies the same rule to Shavuot, and to the Seventh Day of Passover and Shemini Atzeret, for consistency.

Yom Kippur is not observed for two days anywhere because of the difficulty of maintaining a fast over two days. (Note: In practice, the Sanhedrin had the discretion to arrange the month proclamations so that Elul would almost never be extended to 30 days. See BT Rosh Hashanah 19b, as well as commentators there. This greatly reduced the practical level of doubt as to which day would be the first day of Tishrei. The doubt still existed, so Rosh Hashanah and Sukkot were observed for two days. However, the low level of the doubt–combined with the difficulty of a 49-hour fast–led to the exemption of Yom Kippur from the requirement for a second day of observance. This complex issue is discussed more fully here.)

Shabbat is not observed based on a calendar date, but simply at intervals of seven days. Accordingly, there is never a doubt of the date of Shabbat, and it need never be observed for two days. (Note: There are differing opinions as to the location of the International Date Line for purposes of Jewish law. Accordingly, some halachic authorities do have doubts as to which (secular) day of the week should be considered Shabbat in some Pacific islands. See International date line in Judaism for details.)

Adherents of Reform Judaism and Reconstructionist Judaism generally do not observe the second day of festivals, although some do observe two days of Rosh Hashanah.

== Holidays of biblical and rabbinic (Talmudic) origin ==
=== Shabbat—The Sabbath ===
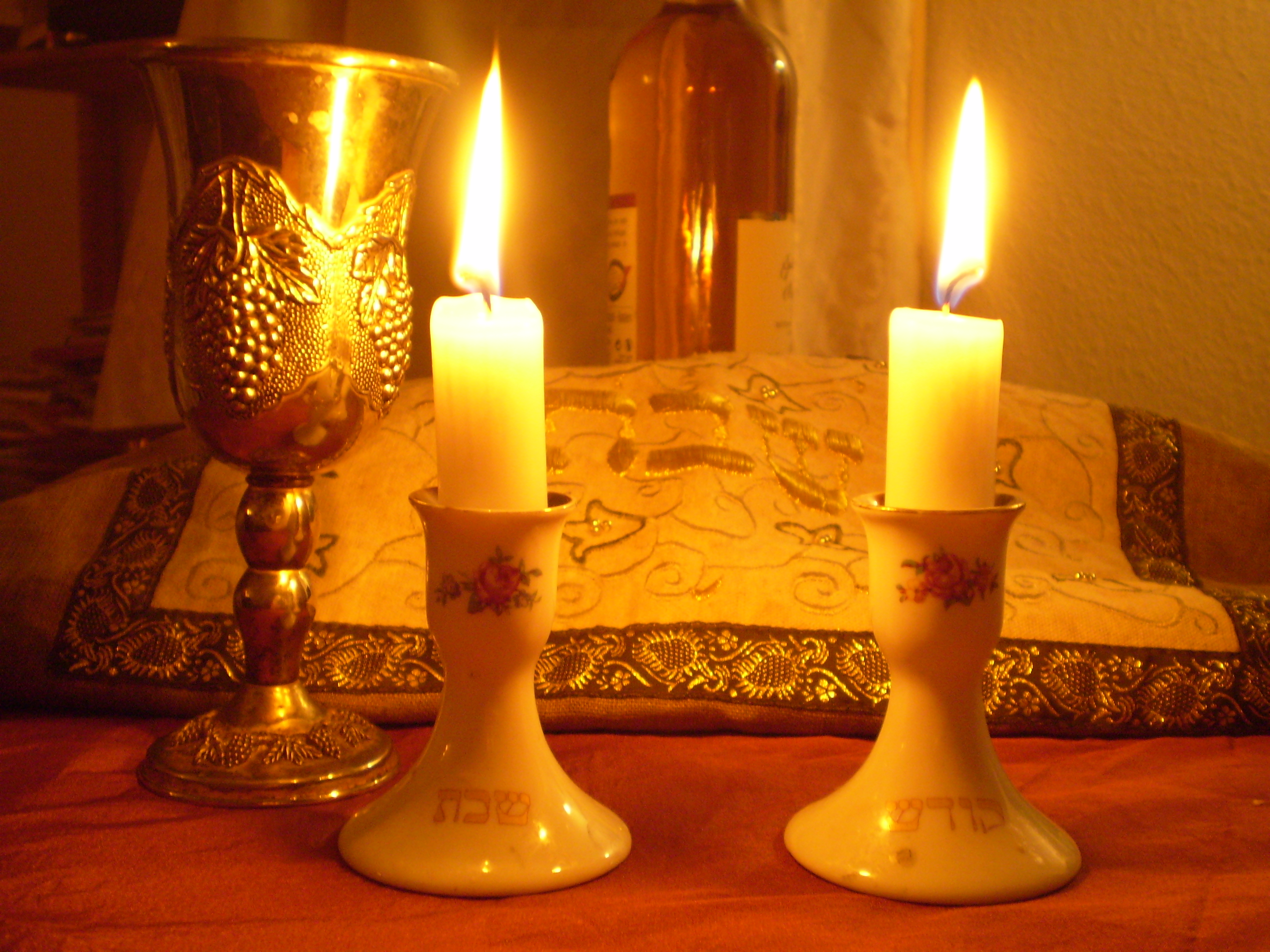
Shabbat candles and kiddush cup

Jewish law (halacha) accords Shabbat (Hebrew: שבת) the status of a holiday, a day of rest celebrated on the seventh day of each week. Jewish law defines a day as ending at either sundown or nightfall, when the next day then begins. Thus,

- Shabbat begins just before sundown Friday night. Its start is marked by the lighting of Shabbat candles and the recitation of Kiddush over a cup of wine.
- Shabbat ends at nightfall Saturday night. Its conclusion is marked by the prayer known as Havdalah.

The fundamental rituals and observances of Shabbat include:

- Reading of the Weekly Torah portion
- Abbreviation of the Amidah in the three regular daily services to eliminate requests for everyday needs
- Addition of a musaf service to the daily prayer services
- Enjoyment of three meals, often elaborate or ritualized, through the course of the day
- Restraint from performing melacha (see above).

In many ways, halakha (Jewish law) sees Shabbat as the most important holy day in the Jewish calendar.

- It is the first holiday mentioned in the Tanakh (Hebrew Bible), and God was the first one to observe it (Genesis).
- The Torah reading on Shabbat has more sections of parshiot (Torah readings) than on Yom Kippur or any other Jewish holiday.
- The prescribed penalty in the Torah for a transgression of Shabbat prohibitions is death by stoning (Exodus 31), while for other holidays the penalty is (relatively) less severe.
- Public observance of Shabbat is the benchmark used in halacha to determine whether an individual is a religiously observant, religiously reliable member of the community.

Arbah Parshiyot

There are four Sabbaths, all during or in proximity to, the month of Adar, which have special significance because of additions which are made during the Torah reading on those days. These include:

- Parshat Shekalim: the Shabbat either preceding or coinciding with Rosh Chodesh Adar (Adar II on a leap year). The portion that is read describes the half-shekel that was brought during Adar.
- Parshat Zachor: the Shabbat immediately preceding Purim. The passage that is read describes the commandment to remember the actions of Amalek. (Listening to this portion being read fulfills that commandment and so special care should be taken to attend Shul this week even if one doesn't always normally attend.)
- Parshat Parah: the Shabbat immediately following Purim. The additional Torah portion describes the ritual of the red heifer.
- Parshat Hachodesh: the Shabbat preceding Rosh Chodesh Nissan. The portion read describes the commandment to recognize Nissan as the first of the Hebrew months.

Other Special Sabbaths

Other Sabbaths throughout the year are considered specially significant because of the time of year or the Torah portion and/or Haftorah being read. Shabbat Shuva is the Shabbat preceding Yom Kippur and Shabbat Hagadol is the Shabbat preceding Pesach. On both of these it is customary for the rabbi of the synagogue to give an extended lecture on a topic related to the upcoming holiday. Shabbat Bereishit is the Shabbos immediately following Simchat Torah, in which the yearly Torah-reading cycle restarts anew. Shabbat Shira is the Shabbos on which the Shirat Hayam is read as part of Parshat Beshalach; it is customary to leave out breadcrumbs before this Shabbos for wild birds to eat. Shabbat Chazon is the Shabbos preceding Tisha b'Av, during which the ominous haftorah of Chazon Yishayahu is read (this completes a cycle of three ominous haftoras leading up to Tisha b'Av). Shabbat Nachamu is the Shabbos following Tisha b'Av during which the consolatory haftorah of Nachamu Ami is read (this begins a cycle of seven consolatory haftorahs following Tisha b'Av, known as the Shiva d'Nechemta). The Shabbat preceding every Rosh Chodesh (except Rosh Hashana) is known as Shabbat Mevorochim; a prayer is added to the liturgy in anticipation of the coming month.

=== Rosh Chodesh—The New Month ===
Rosh Chodesh (Hebrew: ראש חודש, romanized: roš ḥoḏeš, lit. 'head of the month') is a minor holiday or observance occurring on the first day of each month of the Jewish calendar, as well as the last day of the preceding month if it has thirty days.

- Rosh Chodesh observance during at least a portion of the period of the Nevi'im could be fairly elaborate. See, for example, 1 Samuel 20
- Over time there have been varying levels of observance of a custom that women are excused from certain types of work, as in Megilla 22b:4: "the days of the New Moon, when it is customary for women to refrain from work".
- Fasting is normally prohibited on Rosh Chodesh.

Beyond the preceding, current observance is limited to changes in liturgy.

In the month of Tishrei, this observance is superseded by the observance of Rosh Hashanah, a major holiday.

Related observances:

- The date of the forthcoming Rosh Chodesh is announced in synagogue on the preceding Sabbath.
- There are special prayers, the kiddush levana, said upon observing the waxing moon for the first time each month.

=== Rosh Hashanah—The Jewish New Year ===
==== Elul and Selichot ====
The month of Elul that precedes Rosh Hashanah is considered to be a propitious time for repentance. For this reason, additional penitential prayers called Selichot are added to the daily prayers, except on Shabbat. Sephardi Jews add these prayers each weekday during Elul. Ashkenazi Jews recite them from the last Sunday (or Saturday night) preceding Rosh Hashanah that allows at least four days of recitations.

Throughout Elul, the shofar is blown at the end of the morning prayers (except for on Erev Rosh Hashana). Psalm 27 is recited at the end of morning prayers and at the end of afternoon or evening prayers (depending on the community's custom) from the first day of Elul through Hoshana Raba (the last day of Sukkot).

==== Rosh Hashanah ====
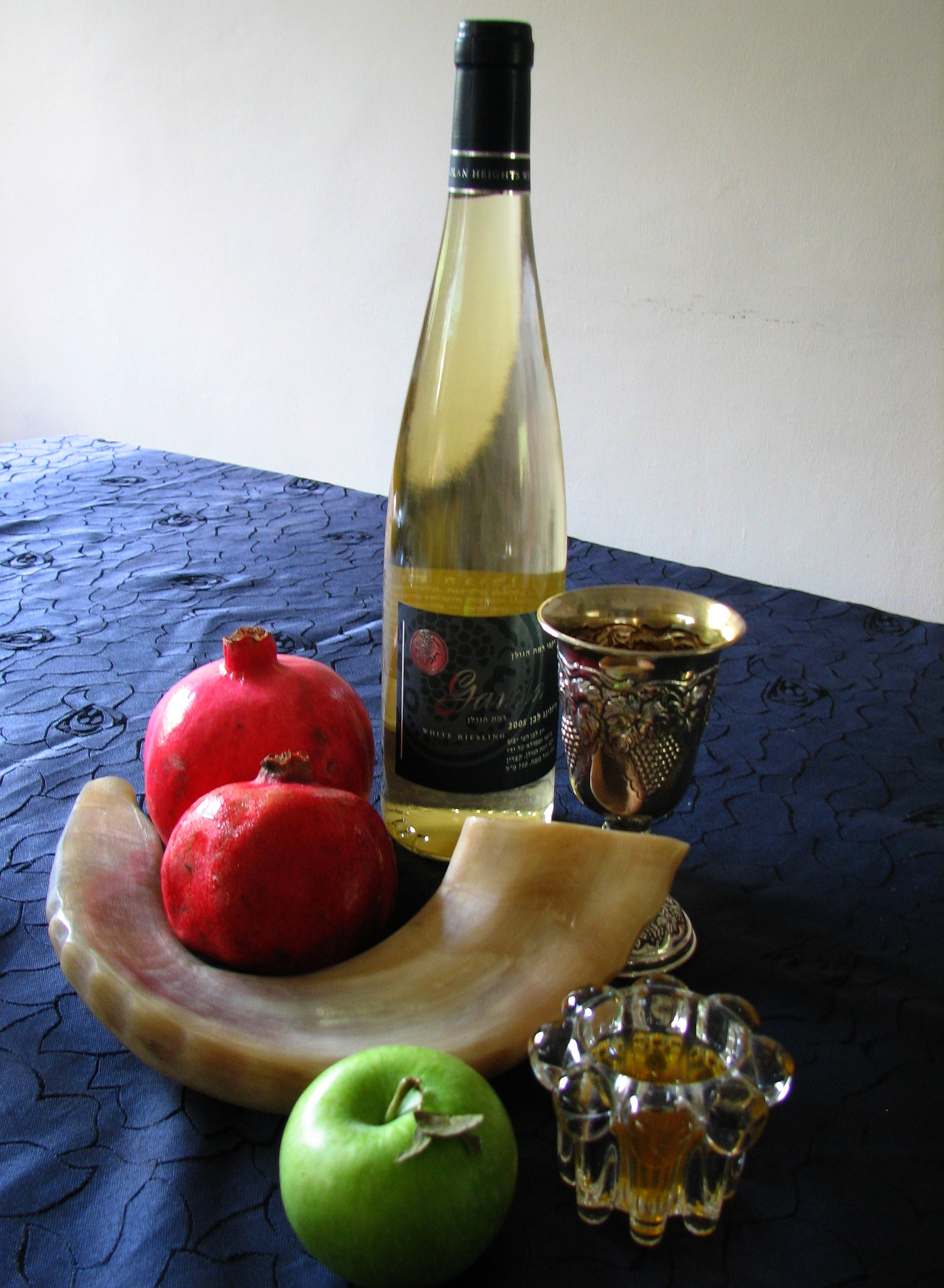
Rosh Hashana symbols: shofar, apples and honey, pomegranates, kiddush wine

- Erev Rosh Hashanah (eve of the first day): 29 Elul
- Rosh Hashanah: 1–2 Tishrei

According to oral tradition, Rosh Hashanah (Hebrew: ראש השנה) (lit., "Head of the Year") is the Day of Memorial or Remembrance (Hebrew: יום הזכרון, Yom HaZikaron), and the day of judgment (Hebrew: יום הדין, Yom HaDin). God appears in the role of King, remembering and judging each person individually according to his/her deeds, and making a decree for each person for the following year.

The holiday is characterized by one specific mitzvah: blowing the shofar. According to the Torah, this is the first day of the seventh month of the calendar year, and marks the beginning of a ten-day period leading up to Yom Kippur. According to one of two Talmudic opinions, the creation of the world was completed on Rosh Hashanah.

Morning prayer services are lengthy on Rosh Hashanah, and focus on the themes described above: majesty and judgment, remembrance, the birth of the world, and the blowing of the shofar. Most communities recite the brief Tashlikh prayer, a symbolic casting off of the previous year's sins, during the afternoon of Rosh Hashanah.

Though the Bible specifies Rosh Hashanah as a one-day holiday, a second day of rabbinic origin is also celebrated. Uniquely among biblical holidays, this additional rabbinic day is observed even within the Land of Israel. (See Second day of biblical festivals, above.)

==== Four New Years ====
The Torah itself does not use any term like "New Year" in reference to Rosh Hashanah. The Mishnah in Rosh Hashanah specifies four different "New Year's Days" for different purposes:

- 1 Tishrei (conventional "Rosh Hashanah"): "new year" for calculating calendar years, sabbatical-year (shmita) and jubilee cycles, and the age of trees for purposes of Jewish law; and for separating grain tithes.
- 15 Shevat (Tu Bishvat): "new year" for trees–i.e., their current agricultural cycle and related tithes.
- 1 Nisan : "New Year" for counting months and major festivals and for calculating the years of the reign of a Jewish king
  - In biblical times, the day following 29 Adar, Year 1 of the reign of ___, would be followed by 1 Nisan, Year 2 of the reign of ___.
  - In modern times, although the Jewish calendar year number changes on Rosh Hashanah, in certain contexts the months are still numbered from Nisan.
  - The three pilgrimage festivals are always reckoned as coming in the order Passover-Shavuot-Sukkot. This can have religious law consequences even in modern times.
- 1 Elul (Rosh Hashanah LeMa'sar Behemah): "new year" for animal tithes. However, the Halacha does not follow this opinion, but rather that the animal tithe goes by 1 Tishrei.

==== Aseret Yemei Teshuva—Ten Days of Repentance ====
The first ten days of Tishrei (from the beginning of Rosh Hashana until the end of Yom Kippur) are known as the Ten Days of Repentance (עשרת ימי תשובה, Aseret Yemei Teshuva). During this time, in anticipation of Yom Kippur, it is "exceedingly appropriate" for Jews to practice repentance, an examination of one's deeds and repentance for sins one has committed against other people and God. This repentance can take the form of additional supplications, confessing one's deeds before God, fasting, self-reflection, and an increase of involvement with, or donations to, tzedakah "charity".

=== Tzom Gedalia—Fast of Gedalia ===
- Tzom Gedalia: 3 Tishrei

The Fast of Gedalia (Hebrew: צום גדליה) is a minor Jewish fast day. It commemorates the assassination of the governor of Yehud province, Gedaliah, which ended any level of Jewish rule following the destruction of Solomon's Temple. According to the simple reading of the Bible, the assassination occurred on Rosh Hashanah (1 Tishrei), and if so, the fast is postponed to 3 Tishrei in respect for the holiday and it is further postponed to 4 Tishrei if 3 Tishrei is Shabbat. However, the Talmud states explicitly that it took place on 3 Tishrei.

As on all minor fast days, fasting from dawn to dusk is required, but other laws of mourning are not normally observed. A Torah reading is included in both the Shaharit and Minha prayers, and a haftarah is also included at Mincha. There are also some additions to the liturgy of both services.

=== Yom Kippur—Day of Atonement ===
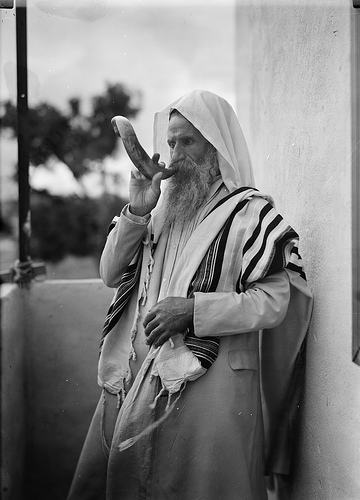
A man in a tallit blows the shofar

- Erev Yom Kippur: 10 Tishrei (Yom Kippur evening begins at sunset)
- Yom Kippur: 10 Tishrei (Yom Kippur day ends at sunset)

Yom Kippur (Hebrew: יום כיפור) is the holiest day of the year for Rabbinic Jews. (Note: Karaite Jews and Samaritans regard Passover as the holiest day of the year.) Its central theme is atonement and reconciliation. This is accomplished through prayer and complete fasting—including abstinence from all food and drink (including water)—by all healthy adults. (Note: Fasting begins at religious majority–age 13 for boys and age 12 for girls. Fasting is prohibited for a variety of medical reasons (e.g., for nursing mothers, diabetics, people with anorexia nervosa, etc.).) Bathing, wearing of perfume or cologne, wearing of leather shoes, and sexual relations are some of the other prohibitions on Yom Kippur—all them designed to ensure one's attention is completely and absolutely focused on the quest for atonement with God. Yom Kippur is also unique among holidays as having work-related restrictions identical to those of Shabbat. The fast and other prohibitions commence on 10 Tishrei at sunset—sunset being the beginning of the day in Jewish tradition.

A traditional recitation in Aramaic called Kol Nidre ("All Vows") is traditionally performed just before sunset. Although often regarded as the start of the Yom Kippur evening service—to such a degree that Erev Yom Kippur ("Yom Kippur Evening") is often called "Kol Nidrei Night"—it is technically a separate tradition. This is especially so because, being recited before sunset, it is actually recited on 9 Tishrei, which is the day before Yom Kippur; it is not recited on Yom Kippur itself (on 10 Tishrei, which begins after the sun sets).

The words of Kol Nidre differ slightly between Ashkenazic and Sephardic traditions. In both, the supplicant prays to be released from all personal vows made to God during the year, so that any unfulfilled promises made to God will be annulled and, thus, forgiven. In Ashkenazi tradition, the reference is to the coming year; in Sephardic tradition, the reference is to the year just ended. Only vows between the supplicant and God are relevant. Vows made between the supplicant and other people remain perfectly valid, since they are unaffected by the prayer.

A Tallit (four-cornered prayer shawl) is donned for evening and afternoon prayers–the only day of the year in which this is done. In traditional Ashkenazi communities, men wear the kittel throughout the day's prayers. The prayers on Yom Kippur evening are lengthier than on any other night of the year. Once services reconvene in the morning, the services (in all traditions) are the longest of the year. In some traditional synagogues prayers run continuously from morning until nightfall, or nearly so. Two highlights of the morning prayers in traditional synagogues are the recitation of Yizkor, the prayer of remembrance, and of liturgical poems (piyyutim) describing the temple service of Yom Kippur.

Two other highlights happen late in the day. During the Minchah prayer, the haftarah reading features the entire Book of Jonah. Finally, the day concludes with Ne'ilah, a special service recited only on the day of Yom Kippur. Ne'ilah deals with the closing of the holiday, and contains a fervent final plea to God for forgiveness just before the conclusion of the fast. Yom Kippur comes to an end with the blowing of the shofar, which marks the conclusion of the fast. It is always observed as a one-day holiday, both inside and outside the boundaries of the Land of Israel.

Yom Kippur is considered, along with 15th of Av, as the happiest days of the year (Talmud Bavli—Tractate Ta'anit).

Day Before Yom Kippur

Some consider the Day Before Yom Kippur, i.e. 9 Tishri, a holiday its own right. The day before Yom Kippur is not Erev Yom Kippur - which is the actual evening of Yom Kippur on 10 Tishri, immediately after sunset and the recitation of Kol Nidre. It is a mitzva (commandment) to eat on the Day Before Yom Kippur, with the sages saying that one who eats throughout this day and then fasts on Yom Kippur proper receives merit as though he had fasted twice. Slight liturgical changes are made to Shacharit, while more significant liturgical changes are made to Mincha. Many Ashkenazi Orthodox men traditionally take a mikvah on the day before Yom Kippur.

=== Sukkot—Feast of Booths (or Tabernacles) ===
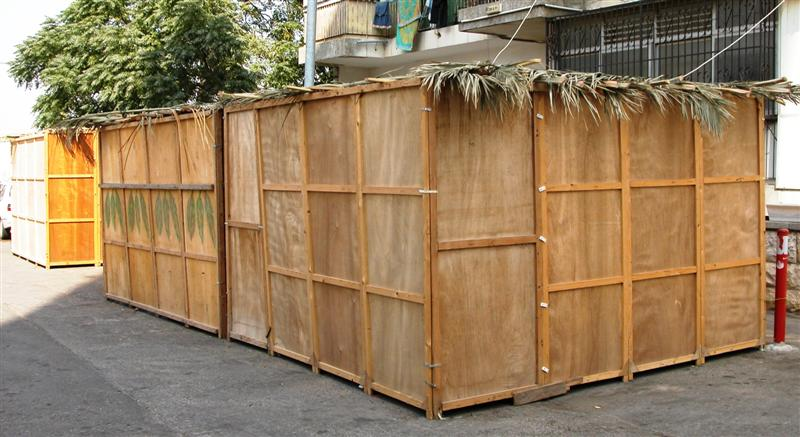
A sukkah booth

- Erev Sukkot: 14 Tishrei
- Sukkot: 15–21 Tishrei (22 outside Israel)
- The first day of Sukkot is (outside Israel, first two days are) full yom tov, while the remainder of Sukkot has the status of Chol Hamoed, "intermediate days".

Sukkot (Hebrew: סוכות or Hebrew: סֻכּוֹת, sukkōt) or Succoth is a seven-day festival, also known as the Feast of Booths, the Feast of Tabernacles, or just Tabernacles. It is one of the Three Pilgrimage Festivals (shalosh regalim) mentioned in the Bible. Sukkot commemorates the years that the Jews spent in the desert on their way to the Promised Land, and celebrates the way in which God protected them under difficult desert conditions. The word sukkot is the plural of the Hebrew word sukkah, meaning booth. Jews are commanded to "dwell" in booths during the holiday. This generally means taking meals, but some sleep in the sukkah as well, particularly in Israel. There are specific rules for constructing a sukkah.

Along with dwelling in a sukkah, the principal ritual unique to this holiday is use of the Four Species: lulav (palm), hadass (myrtle), aravah (willow) and etrog (citron). On each day of the holiday other than Shabbat, these are waved in association with the recitation of Hallel in the synagogue, then walked in a procession around the synagogue called the Hoshanot.

Hoshana Rabbah

The seventh day of the Sukkot is called Hoshanah Rabbah, the "Great Hoshanah" (singular of Hoshanot and the source of the English word hosanna). The climax of the day's prayers includes seven processions of Hoshanot around the synagogue. This tradition mimics practices from the Temple in Jerusalem. Many aspects of the day's customs also resemble those of Rosh Hashanah and Yom Kippur. Hoshanah Rabbah is traditionally taken to be the day of the "delivery" of the final judgment of Yom Kippur, and offers a last opportunity for pleas of repentance before the holiday season closes.

=== Shemini Atzeret and Simchat Torah ===
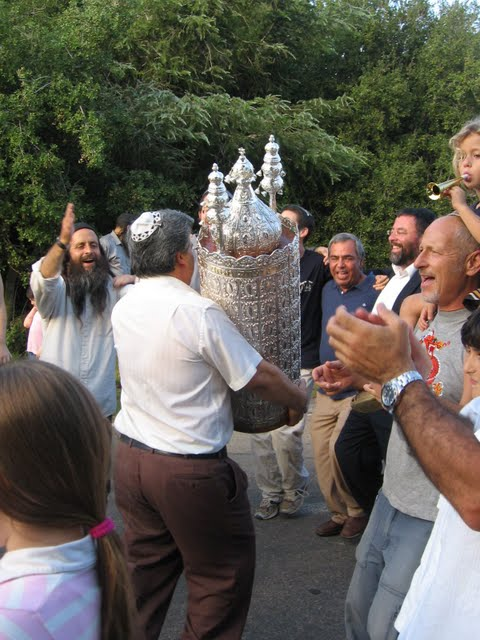
Dancing with the Torah

- Shemini Atzeret: 22 Tishrei (combined with Simchat Torah in Israel)
- Simchat Torah outside Israel: 23 Tishrei

The holiday of Shemini Atzeret (Hebrew: שמיני עצרת) immediately follows the conclusion of the holiday of Sukkot. The Hebrew word shemini means "eighth", and refers to its position on "the eighth day" of Sukkot, actually a seven-day holiday. This name reflects the fact that while in many respects Shemini Atzeret is a separate holiday in its own right, in certain respects its celebration is linked to that of Sukkot. Outside Israel, meals are still taken in the Sukkah on this day.

The main notable custom of this holiday is the celebration of Simchat Torah (Hebrew: שמחת תורה), meaning "rejoicing with the Torah". This name originally referred to a special "ceremony": the last weekly Torah portion is read from Deuteronomy, completing the annual cycle, and is followed immediately by the reading of the first chapter of Genesis, beginning the new annual cycle. Services are especially joyous, and all attendees, young and old, are involved.

This ceremony so dominates the holiday that in Israel, where the holiday is one day long, the whole holiday is often referred to as Simchat Torah. Outside Israel, the holiday is two days long; the name Shemini Atzeret is used for the first day, while the second is normally called Simchat Torah.

=== Hanukkah—Festival of Lights ===
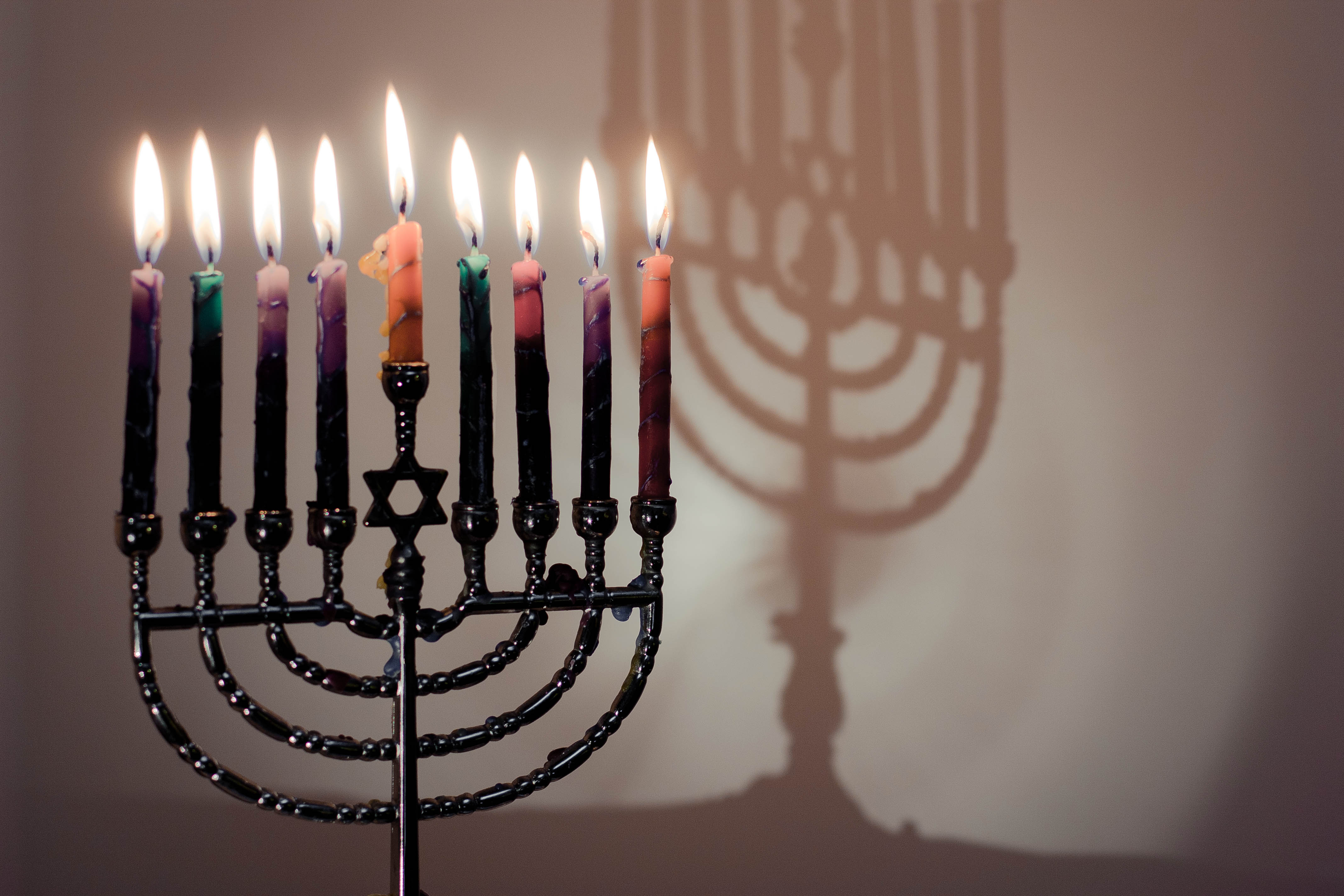
Hanukkiah

- Erev Hanukkah: 24 Kislev
- Hanukkah: 25 Kislev – 2 or 3 Tevet

The story of Hanukkah (Hebrew: חנוכה) is preserved in the books of the First and Second Maccabees. These books are not part of the Tanakh (Hebrew Bible), they are apocryphal books instead. The miracle of the one-day supply of olive oil miraculously lasting eight days is first described in the Talmud (Shabbat 21b), written about 600 years after the events described in the books of Maccabees.

Hanukkah marks the defeat of Seleucid Empire forces that had tried to prevent the people of Israel from practicing Judaism. Judah Maccabee and his brothers destroyed overwhelming forces, and rededicated the Temple in Jerusalem. The eight-day festival is marked by the kindling of lights—one on the first night, two on the second, and so on—using a special candle holder called a Hanukkiah, or a Hanukkah menorah.

Religiously, Hanukkah is a minor holiday. Except on Shabbat, restrictions on work do not apply. (Note: Some customs around cessation of work do exist–particularly work by women during the period the candles are burning. See, for example, Eliyahu Kitov, "Working on Chanukah", retrieved November 8, 2012.) Aside from the kindling of lights, formal religious observance is restricted to changes in liturgy. Hanukkah celebration tends to be informal and based on custom rather than law. Three widely practiced customs include:

- Consumption of foods prepared in oil, such as potato pancakes or sufganiyot, commemorating the miracle of oil
- Playing the game of dreidel (called a sevivon in Hebrew), symbolizing Jews' disguising of illegal Torah study sessions as gambling meetings during the period leading to the Maccabees' revolt (Note: The game of dreidel itself, though, is likely of much later origin. See, for example, David Golinkin, "The Origin of the Dreidel" at myjewishlearning.com, accessed November 8, 2012.)
- Giving children money, especially coins, called Hanukkah gelt. However, the custom of giving presents is of far more recent, North American, origin, and is connected to the gift economy prevalent around North American Christmas celebrations. (Note: Hanukkah and Christmas fall out during the same period of the year, but are not related religiously.)

=== Tenth of Tevet ===
- Asarah B'Tevet: 10 Tevet

The Tenth of Tevet (Hebrew: עשרה בטבת, Asarah B'Tevet) is a minor fast day, marking the beginning of the siege of Jerusalem as outlined in 2 Kings 25:1

And it came to pass in the ninth year of his reign, in the tenth month, in the tenth day of the month, that Nebuchadnezzar king of Babylon came, he and all his army, against Jerusalem, and encamped against it; and they built forts against it round about.

This fast's commemoration also includes other events occurring on 8, 9 and 10 Tevet.

This fast is observed like other minor fasts (see Tzom Gedalia, above). This is the only minor fast that can fall on a Friday under the current fixed Jewish calendar.

=== Tu Bishvat—New Year of the Trees ===
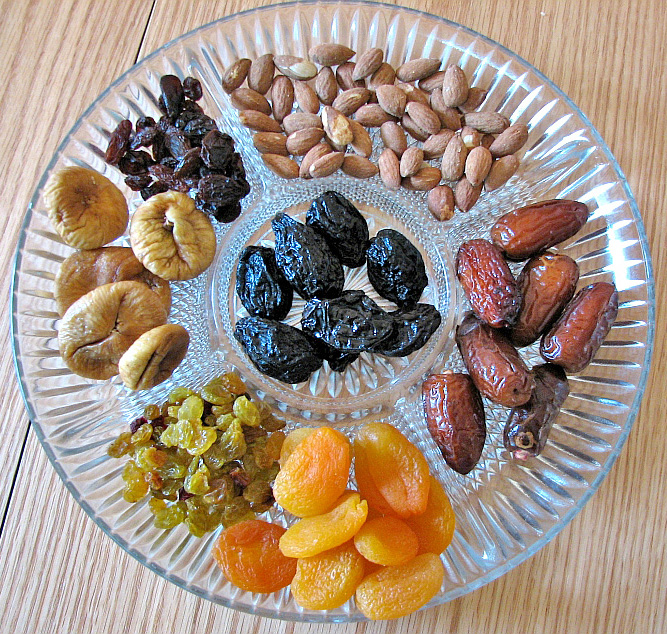
Nuts and dried fruits, traditionally eaten on Tu Bishvat

- Tu Bishvat: 15 Shevat

Tu Bishvat (ט"ו בשבט) (lit., "fifteenth of Shevat", as ט״ו is the number "15" in Hebrew letters), is the new year for trees. It is also known as חג האילנות (Ḥag ha-Ilanot, Festival of Trees), or ראש השנה לאילנות (Rosh ha-Shanah la-Ilanot, New Year for Trees). According to the Mishnah, it marks the day from which fruit tithes are counted each year. Starting on this date, the biblical prohibition on eating the first three years of fruit (orlah) and the requirement to bring the fourth year fruit (neta revai) to the Temple in Jerusalem were counted.

During the 17th century, Rabbi Yitzchak Luria of Safed and his disciples created a short seder, called Hemdat ha‑Yamim, reminiscent of the seder that Jews observe on Passover, that explores the holiday's Kabbalistic themes. This Tu Bishvat seder has witnessed a revival in recent years. More generally, Tu Bishvat is celebrated in modern times by eating various fruits and nuts associated with the Land of Israel.

Traditionally, trees are planted on this day. Many children collect funds leading up to this day to plant trees in Israel. Trees are usually planted locally as well.

=== Purim—Festival of Lots ===
- Fast of Esther: normally 13 Adar
- Purim: 14 Adar
- Shushan Purim: 15 Adar
- In leap years on the Hebrew calendar, the above dates are observed in the Second Adar (Adar Sheni). The 14th and 15th of First Adar (Adar Rishon) are known as Purim Katan

==== Purim Katan ====
Purim Katan (פורים קטן) (lit., "small Purim") is observed on the 14th and 15th of First Adar in leap years. These days are marked by a small increase in festivity, including a prohibition on fasting, and slight changes in the liturgy.

==== Ta'anit Esther–Fast of Esther ====
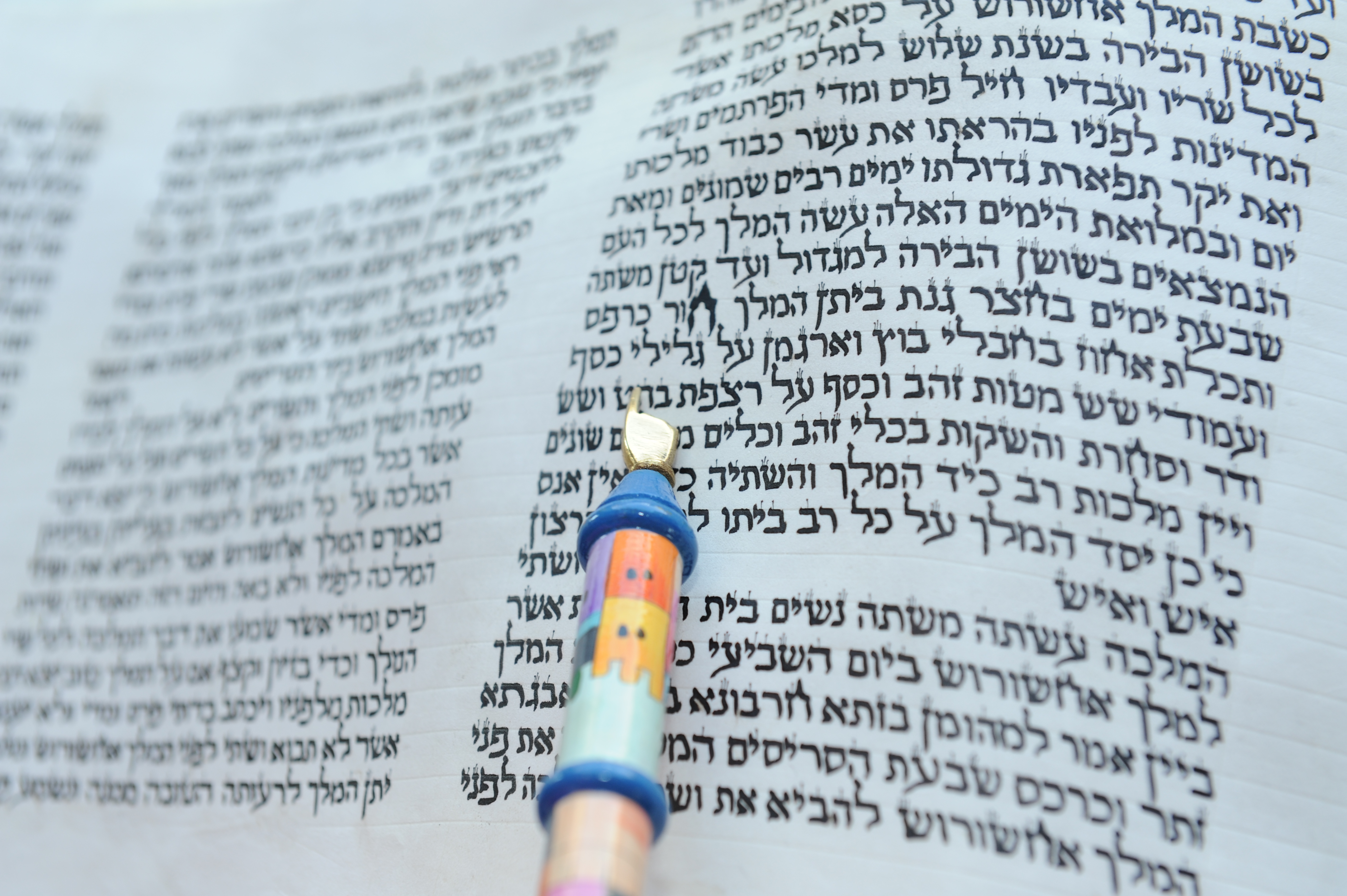
The opening chapter of a hand-written scroll of the Book of Esther, with reader's pointer

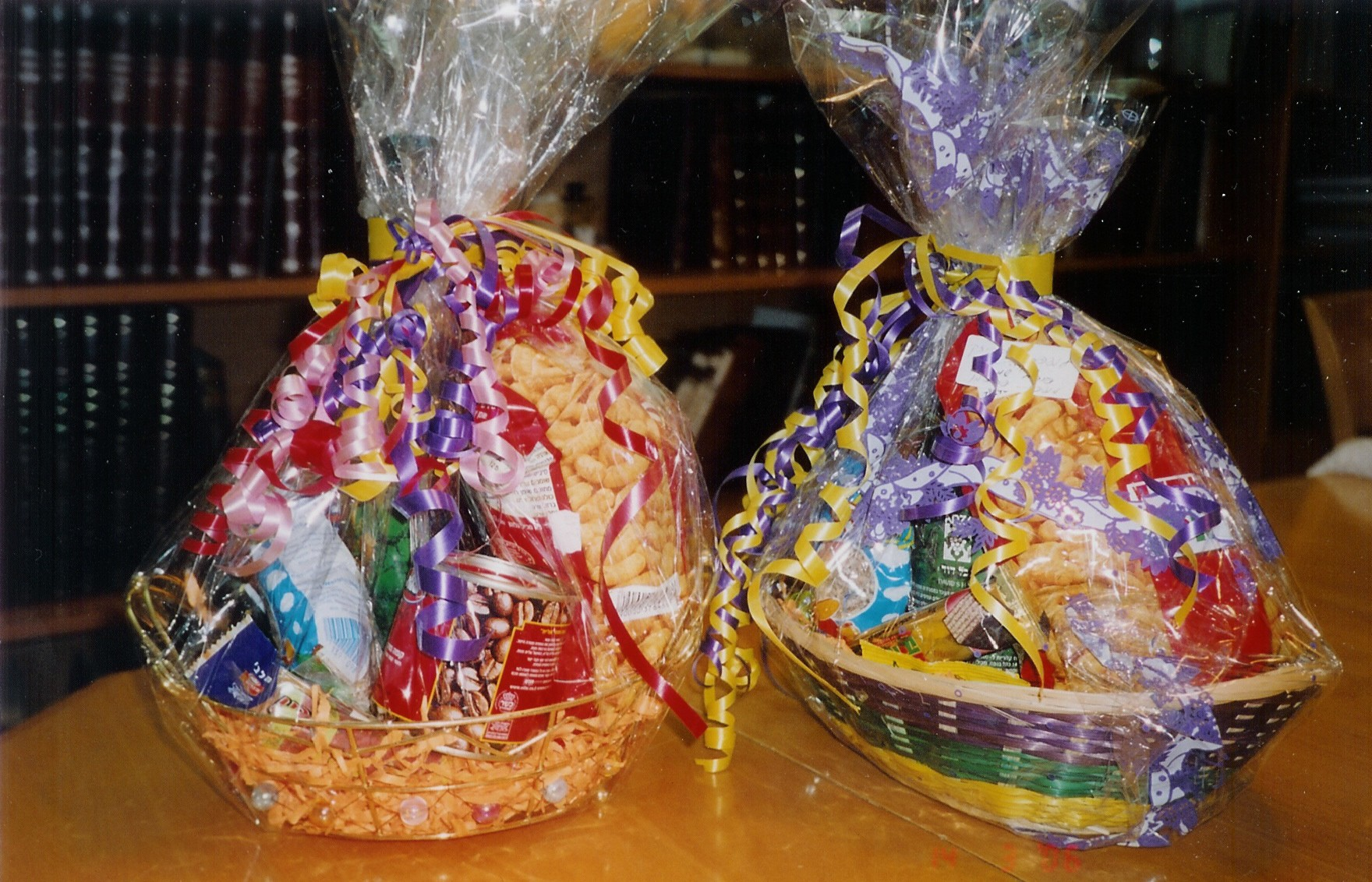
Mishloah manot

Ta'anit Esther (תענית אסתר), or "Fast of Esther", is named in honor of the fast of Esther and her court as Esther prepared to approach the king unbidden to invite him and Haman to a banquet. It commemorates that fast, as well as one alluded to later in the Book of Esther, undertaken as the Jews prepared to battle their enemies.

This fast is observed like other minor fasts (see Tzom Gedalia, above). While normally observed on 13 Adar, the eve of Purim, this fast is advanced to Thursday, 11 Adar, when 13 Adar falls on Shabbat.

==== Purim and Shushan Purim ====
Purim (פורים) commemorates the events that took place in the Book of Esther. The principal celebrations or commemorations include:

- The reading of the Megillah. Traditionally, this is read from a scroll twice during Purim–once in the evening and again in the morning. Ashkenazim have a custom of making disparaging noises at every mention of Haman's name during the reading.
- The giving of Mishloakh Manot, gifts of food and drink to friends and neighbors.
- The giving of Matanot La'evyonim, gifts to the poor and the needy.
- The Purim meal (Se'udat Purim or Purim Se'udah). This meal is traditionally accompanied by consumption of alcohol, often heavy, although Jewish sages have warned about the need to adhere to all religious laws even in a drunken state. (Note: The requirement to drink at the Purim Se'udah does not create license for dangerous or immoral behavior. See Se'udat Purim, as well as Josh Rossman and Shlomo Yaros (March 6, 2004). "Baruch Haman, Arur Mordechai". Kol Torah, Vol. 13 No. 24. Torah Academy of Bergen County. Archived from the original on July 18, 2011. and Jeffrey Spitzer. "Drinking on Purim". MyJewishLearning.com. Archived from the original on January 9, 2015.)

Several customs have evolved from these principal commemorations. One widespread custom to act out the story of Purim. The Purim spiel, or Purim play, has its origins in this, although the Purim spiel is not limited to that subject. Wearing of costumes and masks is also very common. These may be an outgrowth of Purim plays, but there are several theories as to the origin of the custom, most related in some way to the "hidden" nature of the miracles of Purim. (Note: One common suggestion is that the custom comes from Esther's hiding her family background when first brought to the palace.Esther 2:10. See Ariela Pelaia. "Purim–Jewish Holiday of Purim". about.com Judaism. Archived from the original on November 18, 2012. See Rabbi Yair Hoffman (February 25, 2010). "New York–Purim Costumes–A History–Reasons and Origins". Vos iz Neias.com., for another theory.)

Purim carnivals of various types have also become customary. In Israel there are festive parades, known as Ad-D'lo-Yada, in the town's main street. The largest and most renowned is in Holon.

Most Jews celebrate Purim on 14 Adar, the day of celebration after the Jews defeated their enemies. Because Jews in the capital city of Shushan fought with their enemies an extra day, Purim is celebrated a day later there, on the day known as שושן פורים, Shushan Purim. This observance was expanded to "walled cities", which are defined as cities "walled since the time of Joshua". In practice, there are no Jews living in Shushan (Shush, Iran), and Shushan Purim is observed fully only in Jerusalem. Cities like Safed and Tiberias also partially observe Shushan Purim. Elsewhere, Shushan Purim is marked only by a small increase in festivity, including a prohibition on fasting, and slight changes in the liturgy.

Purim Meshulash

If 15 Adar falls out on Shabbos, Jews in Jerusalem celebrate a unique 3-day Purim known as Purim Meshulash. The reading of the Megillah and the giving of Matanot L'evyonim occur on Friday; the Torah Reading for Purim is read on Shabbos and Al-Hanisim (the liturgical addition for Purim) is said; and the Purim Meal and the giving of Mishloach Manot occur on Sunday.

=== Pesach—Passover ===
- Erev Pesach and Fast of the Firstborn, ("Ta'anit Bechorot"): 14 Nisan
- Pesach (Note: The text of the Torah itself uses the term Pesach to refer to the Korban Pesach, the offering of the paschal lamb, as well as the day that the sacrifice is offered—14 Nisan. See Leviticus 23:5. The long pilgrimage festival of 15–21 Nisan is always called Ḥag haMatzot, or "Festival of Unleavened Bread"; see Lev. 23:6. This distinction is still made in Karaite Judaism and in Samaritanism. In conventional Rabbinic Judaism the term Pesach now commonly refers to the pilgrimage festival itself, although the text of the liturgy continues to use the name Ḥag haMatzot.) (Passover): 15–21 Nisan (outside Israel 15–22 Nisan)
- The first day and last day of Passover (outside Israel, first two and last two days) are full yom tov, while the remainder of Passover has the status of Chol Hamoed, "intermediate days".
- Pesach Sheni (second Passover): 14 Iyar

==== Month of Nisan ====
As a rule, the month of Nisan is considered to be one of extra joy. Traditionally, throughout the entire month, Tahanun is omitted from the prayer service, many public mourning practices (such as delivering a eulogy at a funeral) are eliminated, and voluntary fasting is prohibited. However, practices sometimes vary.

==== Eve of Passover and Fast of the Firstborn ====
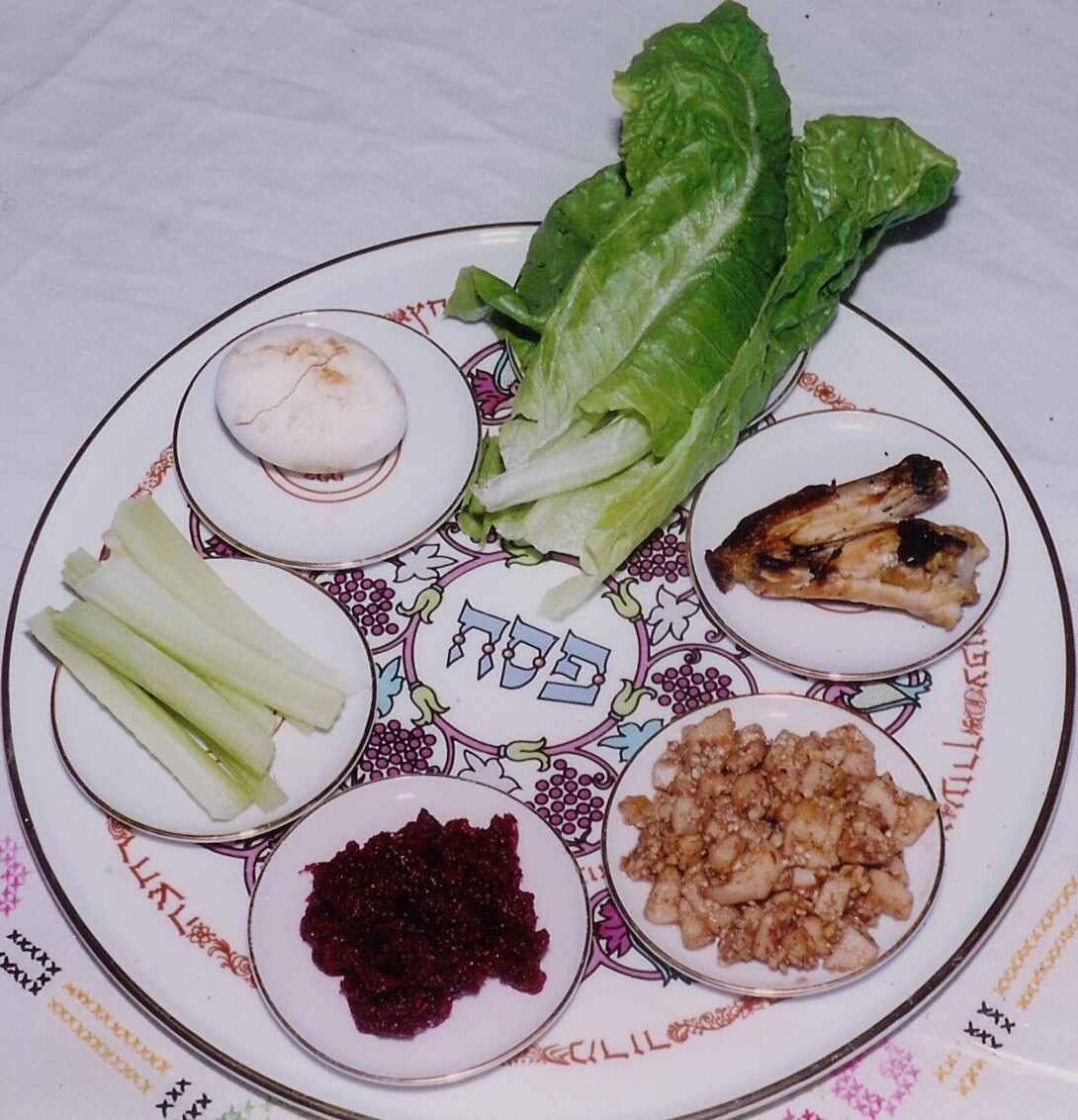
Traditional arrangement of symbolic foods on a Passover Seder Plate

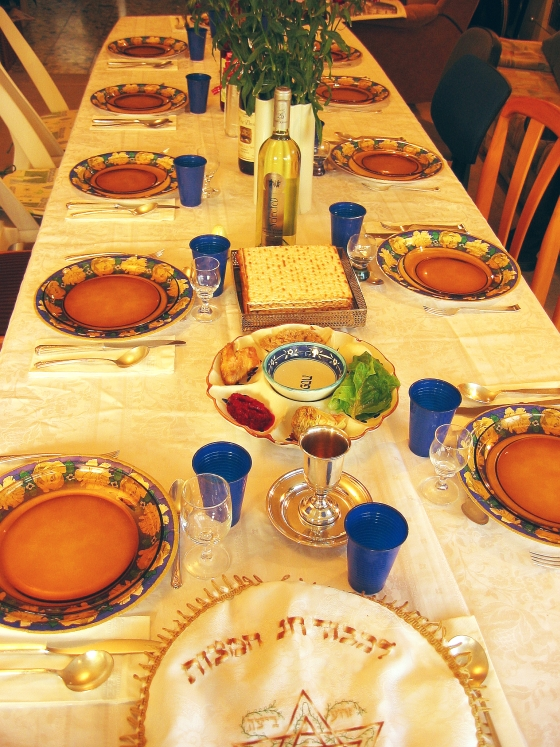
Table set for Passover seder

The day before Passover (Erev Pesach, lit., "Passover eve") is significant for three reasons:

- It is the day that all of the involved preparations for Passover, especially elimination of leavened food, or chametz, must be completed. In particular, a formal search for remaining chametz is done during the evening of Erev Pesach, and all remaining chametz is finally destroyed, disposed of or nullified during the morning of Erev Pesach.
- It is the day observed as the Fast of the Firstborn (תענית בכורות). Jews who are firstborn (Note: Exactly what this means is disputed. See Fast of the Firstborn (Qualifications for fasting).) fast, in remembrance of the tenth plague, when God killed the Egyptian firstborn, while sparing the Jewish firstborn. This fast is overridden by a seudat mitzvah, a meal celebrating the fulfillment of a commandment; accordingly, it is almost universal for firstborn Jews to attend such a meal on this day (Note: The Halachic authorities say that a meal associated with a Brit milah is for sure a seudat mitzvah for these purposes, and they are debate whether a siyum is enough. Nevertheless, the common practice is to allow for a siyyum, a meal celebrating the conclusion of substantial study of Talmud, and this is what is usually done since there is great flexibility around scheduling such an event.) so as to obviate their need to fast.
- During the era of the Temple in Jerusalem, the Korban Pesach, or sacrifice of the Paschal Lamb, was carried out the afternoon of 14 Nisan in anticipation of its consumption on Passover night. This is reflected in post-temple time through slight changes to the liturgy.

When Passover starts on Sunday, and the eve of Passover is therefore Shabbat, the above schedule is altered. See Eve of Passover on Shabbat for details.

==== Passover ====
Passover (פּסח) (Pesach), also known liturgically as חג המצות ("Ḥag haMatzot", the "Festival of Unleavened Bread"), is one of the Three Pilgrimage Festivals (shalosh regalim) mentioned in the Torah. Passover commemorates the Exodus, the liberation of the Israelite slaves from Egypt. No chametz (leavened food) is eaten, or even owned, during the week of Passover, in commemoration of the biblical narrative in which the Israelites left Egypt so quickly that their bread did not have enough time to rise. Observant Jews go to great lengths to remove all chametz from their homes and offices in the run-up to Passover.

Along with the avoidance of chametz, the principal ritual unique to this holiday is the seder. The seder, meaning "order", is an ordered ritual meal eaten on the first night of Passover, and outside Israel also on the second night. This meal is known for its distinctive ritual foods—matzo (unleavened bread), maror (bitter herbs), and four cups of wine—as well as its prayer text/handbook/study guide, the Haggadah. Participation in a Passover seder is one of the most widely observed Jewish rituals, even among less affiliated or less observant Jews.

Passover lasts seven days in Israel, and eight days outside Israel. The holiday of the last day of Passover (outside Israel, last two days) commemorates the Splitting of the Red Sea; according to tradition this occurred on the seventh day of Passover.

==== Pesach Sheni ====
Pesach Sheni (פסח שני) ("Second Passover") is a day prescribed in the Torah to allow those who did not bring the Paschal Lamb offering (Korban Pesach) a second chance to do so. Eligibility was limited to those who were distant from Jerusalem on Passover, or those who were ritually impure and ineligible to participate in a sacrificial offering. Today, some have the custom to eat matzo on Pesach Sheni, and some make a small change to the liturgy.

=== Sefirah—Counting of the Omer ===
- Sefirat HaOmer (Counting of the Omer): 16 Nisan – 5 Sivan (Note: Based on the source text at Lev. 23:11, normative Jewish practice identifies the start of the Omer period as the second day of Passover, or 16 Nisan. (See Shulchan Aruch OC 489 – via Wikisource.) Based on the same source text, Karaite practice identifies this as the first Sunday on or after 16 Nisan, and therefore places Shavuot on the eighth Sunday on or after 16 Nisan—both as reckoned on the Karaite calendar. (See Karaite Judaism: Sephirath Ha‘Omer and Shavu‘oth.))

Sefirah (lit. "Counting"; more fully, Sefirat HaOmer, "Counting of the Omer") (ספירת העומר), is the 49-day period between the biblical pilgrimage festivals of Passover and Shavuot. The Torah states that this period is to be counted, both in days and in weeks. The first day of this period is the day of the first grain offering of the new year's crop, an omer of barley. The day following the 49th day of the period is the festival of Shavuot; the Torah specifies a grain offering of wheat on that day.

Symbolically, this period has come to represent the spiritual development of the Israelites from slaves in the polytheistic society of Ancient Egypt to free, monotheistic people worthy of the revelation of the Torah, traditionally said to have occurred on Shavuot. Spiritual development remains a key rabbinic teaching of this period.

Sefirah has long been observed as a period of semi-mourning. The customary explanation cites a plague that killed 24,000 students of Rabbi Akiva (BT Yevamot 62b). (Note: Neither the Torah nor the Talmud specifies Sefirah as a mourning period. However, there is evidence that this custom was in place by the era of the Geonim, which ended around 1040 CE. See Kahn, Rabbi Ari (February 20, 2006). "Rebbe Akiva's 24,000 Students". aish.com.) In broad terms, the mourning practices observed include limiting actual celebrations (such as weddings), not listening to music, not wearing new clothing, and not shaving or taking a haircut. There is a wide variety of practice as to the specifics of this observance. See Counting of the Omer (Semi-mourning).

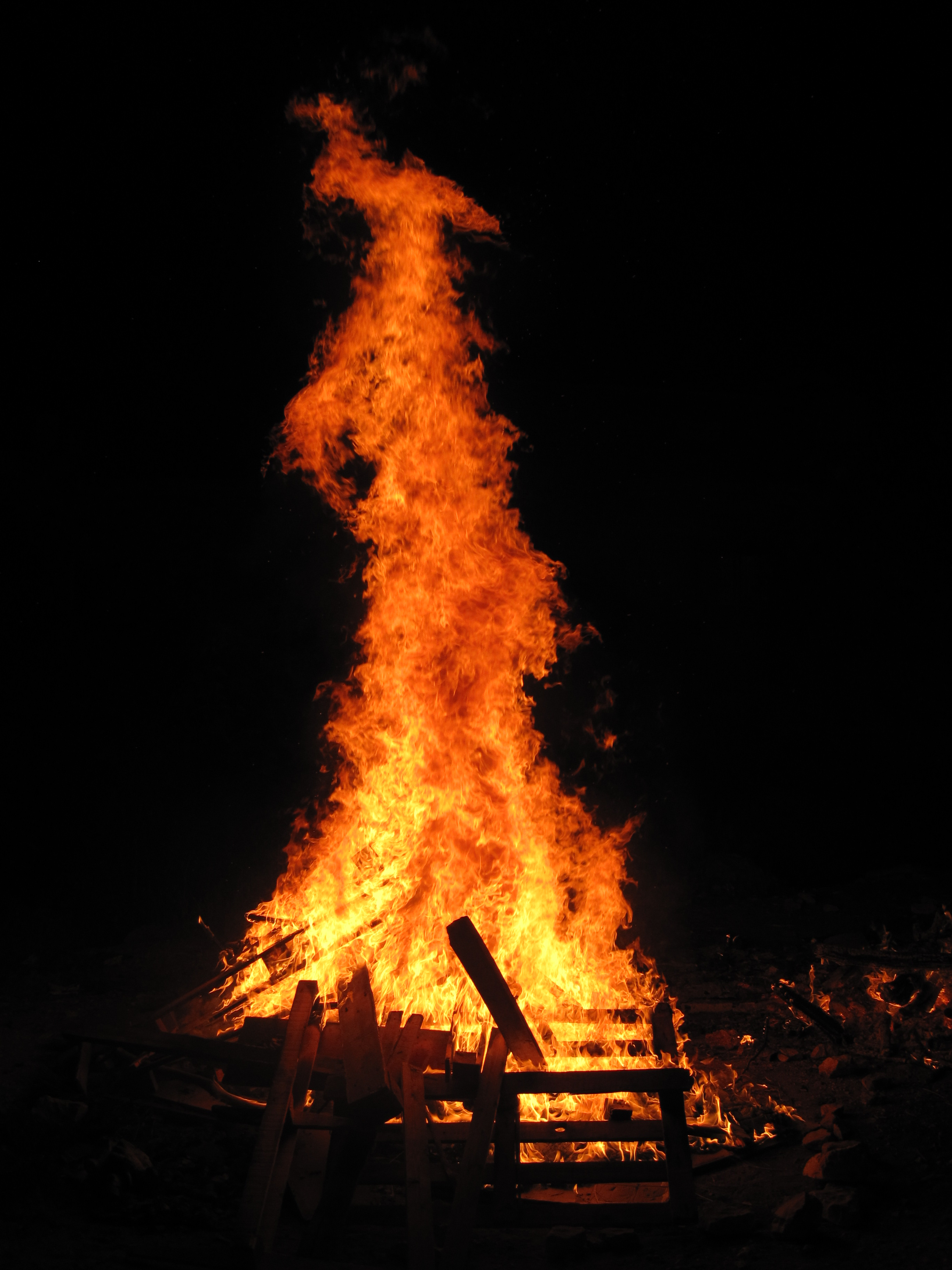
Lag Ba'Omer bonfire

==== Lag Ba'Omer ====
- Lag Ba'Omer: 18 Iyar

Lag Ba'Omer (לַ״ג בָּעוֹמֶר) is the 33rd day in the Omer count (לַ״ג is the number 33 in Hebrew). By Ashkenazi practice, the semi-mourning observed during the period of Sefirah (see above) is lifted on Lag Ba'Omer, while Sefardi practice is to lift it at the end of Lag Ba'Omer. Minor liturgical changes are made on Lag Ba'omer; because mourning practices are suspended, weddings are often conducted on this day.

Lag Ba'Omer is identified as the Yom Hillula (yahrzeit) of Rabbi Shimon bar Yochai, one of the leading Tannaim (teachers quoted in the Mishna) and ascribed author of the core text of Kabbalah, the Zohar. Customary celebrations include bonfires, picnics, and bow and arrow play by children. Boys sometimes receive their first haircuts on Lag Ba'Omer, while Hasidic rebbes hold tishes in honor of the day.

In Israel, Lag Ba'Omer is associated with the Bar Kokhba revolt against the Roman Empire. In Zionist thought, the plague that decimated Rabbi Akiva's 24,000 disciples is explained as a veiled reference to the revolt; the 33rd day representing the end of the plague is explained as the day of Bar Kokhba's victory. The traditional bonfires and bow-and-arrow play were thus reinterpreted as celebrations of military victory. In this vein, the order originally creating the Israel Defense Forces was issued on Lag Ba'Omer 1948, 13 days after Israel declared independence.

=== Shavuot—Feast of Weeks—Yom HaBikurim ===
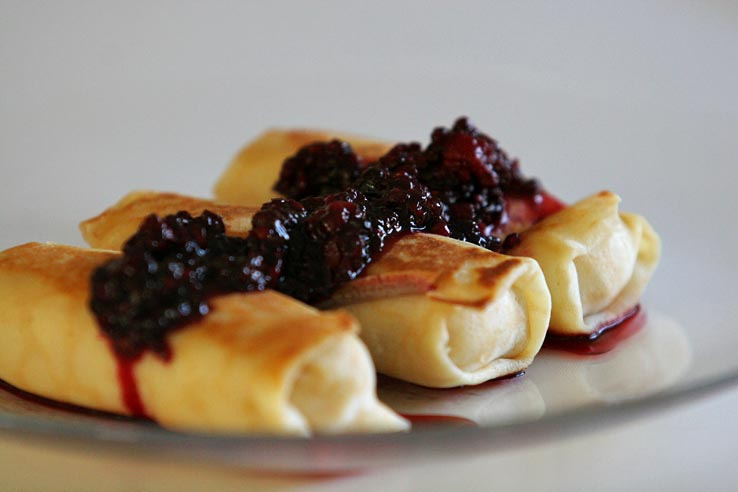
Cheese blintzes, a traditional food on Shavuot

- Erev Shavuot: 5 Sivan
- Shavuot: 6 (and outside Israel: 7) Sivan

Shavuot (שבועות), the Feast of Weeks, is one of the three pilgrimage festivals (Shalosh regalim) ordained in the Torah. Different from other biblical holidays, the date for Shavuot is not explicitly fixed in the Torah. Instead, it is observed on the day following the 49th and final day in the counting of the Omer. In the current era of the fixed Jewish calendar, this puts the date of Shavuot as 6 Sivan. In Israel and in Reform Judaism, it is a one-day holiday; elsewhere, it is a two-day holiday extending through 7 Sivan.

According to Rabbinic tradition, codified in the Talmud at Shabbat 87b, the Ten Commandments were given on this day. In the era of the Temple, there were certain specific offerings mandated for Shavuot, and Shavuot was the first day for bringing of Bikkurim to the Temple. Other than those, there are no explicit mitzvot unique to Shavuot given in the Torah (parallel to matzo on Passover or Sukkah on Sukkot).

Nevertheless, there are a number of widespread customs observed on Shavuot. During this holiday the Torah portion containing the Ten Commandments is read in the synagogue, and the biblical Book of Ruth is read as well. It is traditional to eat dairy meals during Shavuot. In observant circles, all night Torah study is common on the first night of Shavuot, while in Reform Judaism, Shavuot is the customary date for Confirmation ceremonies.

=== Mourning for Jerusalem: Seventeenth of Tammuz and Tisha B'Av ===
The three-week period starting on 17 Tammuz and concluding after Tisha B'Av has traditionally been observed as a period of mourning for the destruction of Jerusalem and the Holy Temple there.

==== Fast of the Seventeenth of Tammuz ====
- Shiva Asar B'Tammuz: 17 Tammuz

The Seventeenth of Tamuz (שבעה עשר בתמוז, Shiva Asar B'Tamuz) traditionally marks the first breach in the walls of the Jerusalem during the Roman conquest in 70 CE, at the end of the Second Temple period. (Note: The Jerusalem Talmud at Ta'anit 4:5 states that the walls were breached on this date during the First Temple period as well, notwithstanding the text of Jeremiah 39:2.) According to tradition, this day has had negative connotations since Moses broke the first set of tablets on this day. The Mishnah cites five negative events that happened on 17 Tammuz.

This fast is observed like other minor fasts (see Tzom Gedalia, above). When this fast falls out on Shabbat, its observance is postponed until Sunday.

==== The Three Weeks and the Nine Days ====
- The Three Weeks: 17 Tammuz – 9 Av
- The Nine Days: 1–9 Av
- The Week of Tisha B'Av (beginning at the conclusion of Shabbat preceding Tisha B'Av)

The period between the fasts of 17 Tammuz and 9 Av, known as the "Three Weeks" (Hebrew: בין המצרים, "between the straits"), features a steadily increasing level of mourning practices as Tisha B'Av approaches. Ashkenazi Jews refrain from conducting weddings and other joyful events throughout the period unless the date is established by Jewish law (as for a bris or pidyon haben). They do not cut their hair during this period. Starting on the first of Av and throughout the nine days between the 1st and 9th days of Av, Ashkenazim traditionally refrain from eating meat and drinking wine, except on Shabbat or at a Seudat Mitzvah (a Mitzvah meal, such as for a bris or siyum). They also refrain from bathing for pleasure. Sefardic practice varies some from this; the less severe restrictions usually begin on 1 Av, while the more severe restrictions apply during the week of Tisha B'Av itself.

Subject to the variations described above, Orthodox Judaism continues to maintain the traditional prohibitions. In Conservative Judaism, the Rabbinical Assembly's Committee on Jewish Law and Standards has issued several responsa (legal rulings) which hold that the prohibitions against weddings in this timeframe are deeply held traditions, but should not be construed as binding law. Thus, Conservative Jewish practice would allow weddings during this time, except on the 17th of Tammuz and 9th of Av themselves. (Note: See, e.g., Rabbi David Golinkin, ed. (1998). Proceedings of the Committee on Jewish Law and Standards of the Conservative Movement 1927–1970. Vol. III. Jerusalem: The Rabbinical Assembly and The Institute of Applied Halakhah.. Based on these responsa, many Conservative rabbis will only perform small weddings in the rabbi's study between 1–9 Av.) Rabbis within Reform Judaism and Reconstructionist Judaism hold that halakha (Jewish law) is no longer binding and follow their individual consciences on such matters. Nevertheless, the rabbinical manual of the Reform movement encourages Reform rabbis not to conduct weddings on Tisha B'Av itself "out of historical consciousness and respect" for the Jewish community.

==== Tisha B'Av—Ninth of Av ====
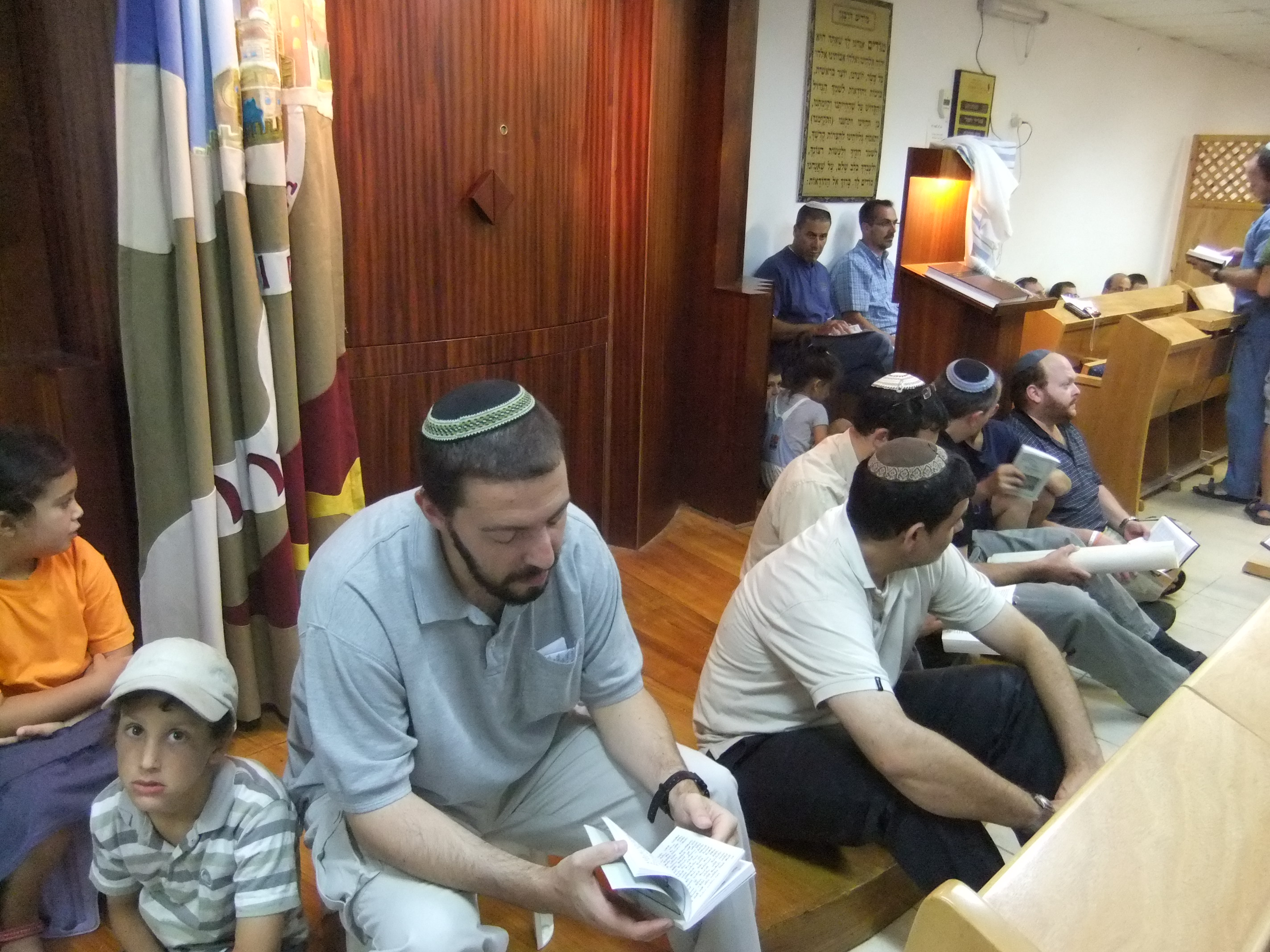
Worshipers seated on the floor of the synagogue before the reading of Lamentations on Tisha B'Av

- Tisha B'Av : 9 Av

Tisha B'Av (תשעה באב) is a major fast day and day of mourning. A Midrashic tradition states that the spies' negative report concerning the Land of Israel was delivered on Tisha B'Av. Consequently, the day became auspicious for negative events in Jewish history. Most notably, both the First Temple, originally built by King Solomon, and the Second Temple of Roman times were destroyed on Tisha B'Av. Other calamities throughout Jewish history are said to have taken place on Tisha B'Av, including King Edward I's edict compelling the Jews to leave England (1290) and the Jewish expulsion from Spain in 1492.

Tisha B'Av is a major fast. It is a 25-hour fast, running from sundown to nightfall. As on Yom Kippur, not only are eating and drinking prohibited, but also bathing, anointing, marital relations and the wearing of leather shoes. Work is not prohibited, as on biblical holidays, but is discouraged. In the evening, the Book of Lamentations is read in the synagogue, while in the morning lengthy kinot, poems of elegy, are recited. From evening until noon mourning rituals resembling those of shiva are observed, including sitting on low stools or the floor; after noon those restrictions are somewhat lightened, in keeping with the tradition that Messiah will be born on Tisha B'Av.

While the fast ends at nightfall of 9–10 Av, the restrictions of the Three Weeks and Nine Days continue through noon on 10 Av because the Second Temple continued to burn through most of that day. When 9 Av falls on Shabbat, when fasting is prohibited, the fast is postponed until 10 Av. In that case, the restrictions of the Three Weeks and Nine Days end with the fast, except for the prohibition against eating meat and drinking wine, which extend until the morning of 10 Av.

=== Tu B'Av ===
- Tu B'Av: 15 Av

Tu B'av (ט״ו באב), lit. "15th of Av", is a day mentioned in the Talmud alongside Yom Kippur as "happiest of the year". It was a day celebrating the bringing of wood used for the Temple Service, as well as a day when marriages were arranged. Today, it is marked by a small change in liturgy. In modern Israel, the day has become somewhat of an analog to Valentine's Day.

=== Other fasts ===
Several other fast days of ancient or medieval origin continue to be observed to some degree in modern times. Such continued observance is usually by Orthodox Jews only, and is not universal today even among Orthodox Jews. (Note: Private fasts are beyond the scope of this article.)

- Fasts for droughts and other public troubles. Much of the Talmudic tractate Ta'anit is devoted to the proclamation and execution of public fasts. The most detailed description refers to fasts in times of drought in the Land of Israel. Apparently these fasts included a Ne'ilah (closing) prayer, a prayer now reserved for recitation on Yom Kippur only.

While the specific fasts described in the Mishnah fell into disuse once Jews were exiled from the land of Israel, various Jewish communities have declared fasts over the years, using these as a model. Two examples include a fast among Polish Jews commemorating the massacre of Jews during the Khmelnytsky Uprising and one among Russian Jews during anti-Jewish pogroms of the 1880s.
Since the establishment of the State of Israel, the Chief Rabbinate of Israel has urged fasting in times of drought.

- Fast of Behav (בה"ב). The fasts of bet-hey-bet—Monday-Thursday-Monday—were established as a vehicle for atonement from possible excesses during the extended holiday periods of Passover and Sukkot. They are proclaimed on the first Shabbat of the month of Iyar following Passover, and at some point in Marcheshvan following Sukkot. Based on the model of Mishnah Ta'anit, they are then observed on the Monday, Thursday and Monday following the Shabbat on which they are announced.
- Yom Kippur Katan ("little Yom Kippur"). These fasts originated in the sixteenth-century Kabbalistic community of Safed. They are conceptually linked to the sin-offerings that were brought to the Temple in Jerusalem on each Rosh Chodesh. These fasts are observed on the day before Rosh Chodesh in most months, and usually observed on the previous Thursday if Rosh Chodesh is on Shabbat or Sunday.
- The Three Days of Darkness. While all Jews observe the fast on the 10th of Tevet, the Halacha also records optional fast days on the 8th and 9th days of Tevet, forming a collective "three days of darkness." The fast of the 8th of Tevet bemoans the translation of the Torah into Greek, while the reason for the fast on the 9th of Tevet was "unrevealed" (much debate exists among Rabbinic and academic scholars as to what event this fast commemorates).

== Israeli/Jewish national holidays and days of remembrance ==
As a general rule, the biblical Jewish holidays (Sabbath, Rosh Hashanah, Yom Kippur, Passover, Shavuot, Sukkot and Purim) are observed as public holidays in Israel. Chanukah is a school holiday, but businesses remain open. On Tisha B'Av, restaurants and places of entertainment are closed. Other Jewish holidays listed above are observed in varying ways and to varying degrees.

Between the creation of the State of Israel in 1948 and the aftermath of the Six-Day War, the Knesset, generally in consultation with the Chief Rabbinate of Israel, established four national holidays or days of remembrance:

- Yom HaShoah: Holocaust Remembrance Day
- Yom Hazikaron: Memorial Day
- Yom Ha'atzmaut: Israel Independence Day
- Yom Yerushalayim: Jerusalem Day

The status of these days as religious events is not uniform within the Jewish world. Non-Orthodox, Religious Zionist and Modern Orthodox Jewish religious movements (Note: Inter alia: Non-orthodox: Union for Traditional Judaism, Conservative Judaism, Reform Judaism and Reconstructionist Judaism; Religious Zionist: Mizrachi–Bnai Akiva; Modern Orthodox: Union of Orthodox Congregations, Rabbinical Council of America, United Hebrew Congregations of the Commonwealth) accept these days as religious as well as national in nature.

As a rule, these four days are not accepted as religious observances by most Haredi Jews, including Hasidim. Some ḥaredim are opposed to the existence of the State of Israel altogether on religious grounds; others simply feel that there are not sufficient grounds under Jewish law to justify the establishment of new religious holidays. For details, see Haredim and Zionism.

Observance of these days in Jewish communities outside Israel is typically more muted than their observance in Israel. Events held in government and public venues within Israel are often held in Jewish communal settings (synagogues and community centers) abroad.

More recently, the Knesset established two additional holidays:

- Yom HaAliyah: Aliyah Day
- A day to commemorate the expulsion of Jews from Arab lands and Iran

Finally, the Israeli government also recognizes several ethnic Jewish observances with holiday status.

=== Yom HaShoah—Holocaust Remembrance Day ===
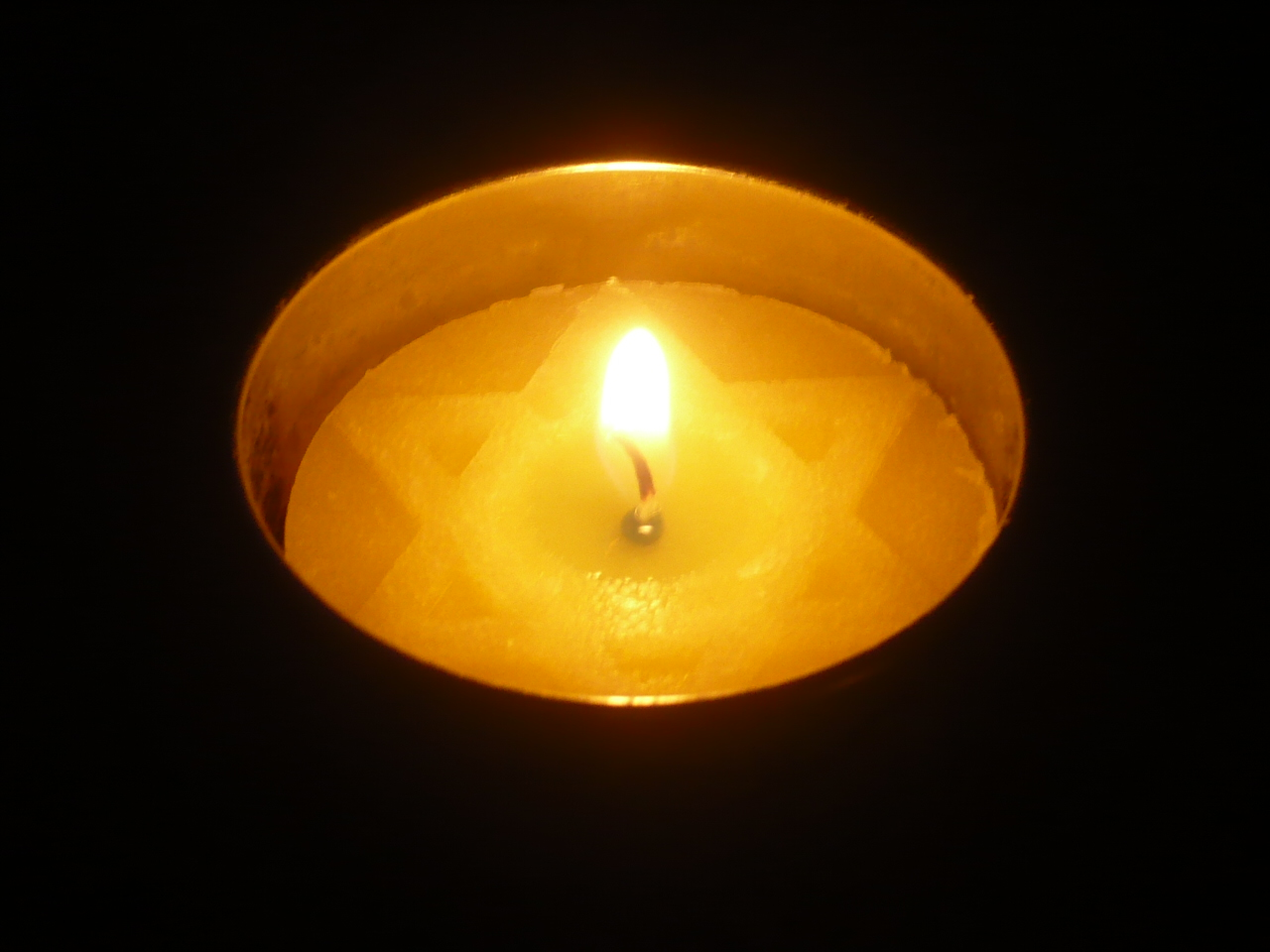
A lit Yom HaShoah Yellow Candle

- Yom HaShoah: (nominally) 27 Nisan

Yom HaShoah (lit. "Holocaust Day") is a day of remembrance for victims of the Holocaust. Its full name is Yom Hazikaron LaShoah v'LiGevurah (lit. "Holocaust and Heroism Remembrance Day") (יום הזכרון לשואה ולגבורה), and reflects a desire to recognize martyrs who died in active resistance to the Nazis alongside those who died as passive victims. Its date, 27 Nisan, was chosen because it commemorates the Warsaw Ghetto Uprising, the best known of the armed Jewish uprisings. (Note: The uprising began on 14 Nisan, Passover eve. There was sufficient opposition to the selection of that date for the memorial that its observance was moved to 27 Nisan, approximately halfway between the end of Passover and Yom Ha'Atzmaut, and still within the period of the uprising. See Rosenberg, Jennifer. "Holocaust Remembrance Day". about.com. Archived from the original on January 20, 2013.) (Note: In contrast, International Holocaust Remembrance Day is observed on January 27, the day the Auschwitz-Birkenau camp was liberated in 1945.)

Places of public entertainment are closed throughout Israel in recognition of the day. Public commemoration of Yom HaShoah usually includes religious elements such as the recitation of Psalms, memorial prayers, and kaddish, and the lighting of memorial candles. In Israel, the most notable observances are the State memorial ceremony at Yad Vashem and the sirens marking off a two-minute silence at 10:00 am. Religious Zionist and Modern Orthodox Jews generally participate in such public observances along with secular Jews and Jews who adhere to more liberal religious movements. Outside Israel, Jewish communities observe Yom HaShoah in addition to or instead of their countries' Holocaust Memorial Days. Probably the most notable commemoration is the March of the Living, held at the site of Auschwitz-Birkenau, attended by Jews from all parts of the world.

Outside Orthodoxy, a liturgy for Yom HaShoah is beginning to develop. The Conservative, Reform and Reconstructionist prayer books all include liturgical elements for Yom HaShoah, to be added to the regular weekday prayers. Conservative Judaism has written a scroll, called Megillat HaShoah, intended to become a definitive liturgical reading for Yom HaShoah. The Orthodox world–even the segment that participates publicly in Yom HaShoah–has been reluctant to write a liturgy for the day, preferring to compose Kinnot (prayers of lamentation) for recitation on Tisha B'Av. (Note: Along with the ḥaredi resistance to new days of commemoration, there is a reluctance to introduce unnecessary mourning during the month of Nisan (see above).)

In order to ensure that public Yom HaShoah ceremonies in Israel do not violate Shabbat prohibitions, the date for Yom HaShoah varies (Note: These changes are not uniformly observed by communities outside Israel, where the ceremonies are not official in nature. And, in fact, sometimes observances outside of Israel are moved to nearby non-working days (like Sundays) to encourage participation.) as follows:

- If 27 Nisan occurs on a Friday, the observance of Yom HaShoah is advanced to the previous day (Thursday, 26 Nisan).
- If 27 Nisan occurs on a Sunday, the observance of Yom HaShoah is delayed to the following day (Monday, 28 Nisan).

=== Yom Hazikaron—Memorial Day ===
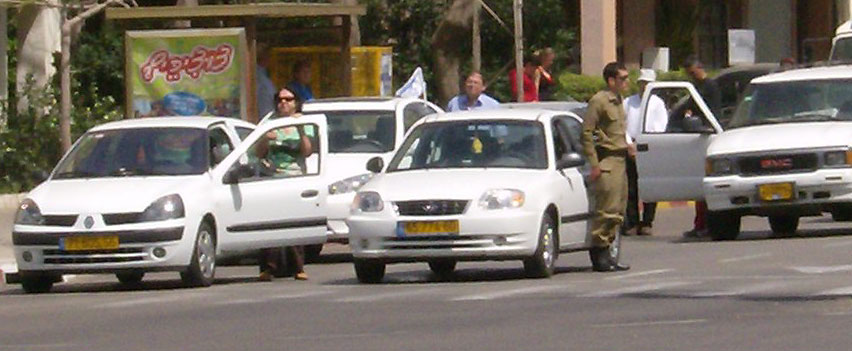
A moment of silence as the siren is sounded in Tel Aviv, Yom Hazikaron 2007

- Yom Hazikaron: (nominally) 4 Iyar

Yom Hazikaron (lit. "Memorial Day") is a day of remembrance of the fallen of Israel's wars. During the first years of Israel's independence, this remembrance was observed on Yom Ha'atzmaut (Independence Day) itself. However, by 1951, the memorial observance was separated from the festive celebration of Independence Day and moved to its current date, the day before Yom Ha'atzmaut. (Note: As early as 1940, 4 Iyar had been established as a memorial day for victims of Arab attacks. See לישוב [Notice to the Yishuv]. Davar (in Hebrew). Tel Aviv. May 6, 1940. Archived from the original on March 3, 2016.) Since 2000, the scope of the memorial has expanded to include civilians slain by acts of hostile terrorism. Its full name is now יום הזכרון לחללי מערכות ישראל ולנפגעי פעולות האיבה ("Day of Remembrance for the Fallen of the Battles of Israel and the Victims of Terror").

Places of public entertainment are closed throughout Israel in recognition of the day. Many schools, businesses and other institutions conduct memorial services on this day, and it is customary to visit the graves of fallen soldiers and to recite memorial prayers there. The principal public observances are the evening opening ceremony at the Western Wall and the morning services of remembrance at military cemeteries throughout the country, each opened by the sounding of sirens. The public observances conclude with the service at the military cemetery on Mount Herzl that serves as the transition to Yom Ha'atzmaut.

Outside Israel, Yom HaZikaron observances are often folded into Yom Ha'atzmaut celebrations. Within Israel, Yom Hazikaron is always the day before Yom Ha'atzmaut, but that date moves to prevent violation of Sabbath prohibitions during the ceremonies of either day. See following section for details.

=== Yom Ha'atzmaut—Israel Independence Day ===
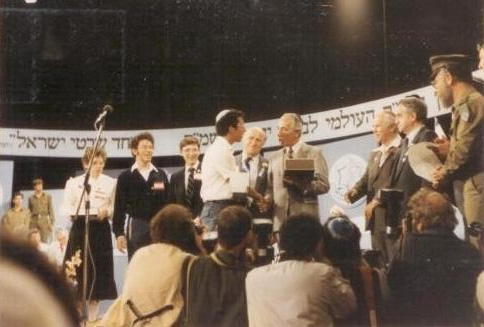
The final round of the International Bible Contest (here in 1985) is held on Yom Ha'atzmaut

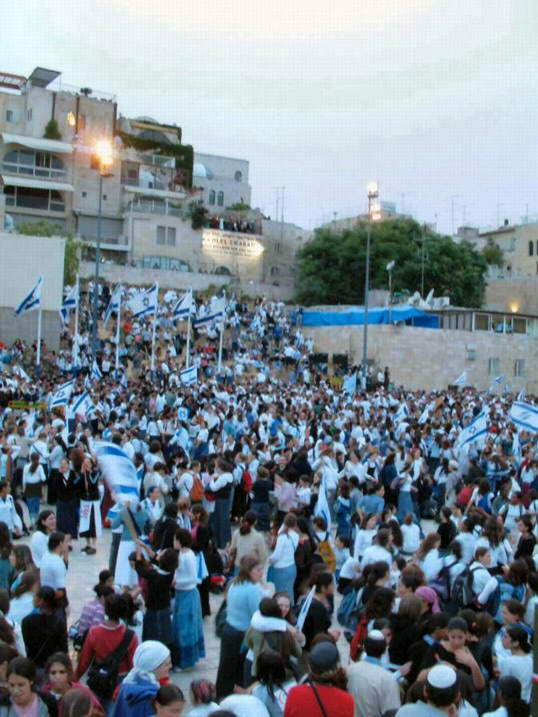
Jerusalem Day celebrations

- Yom Ha'atzmaut: (nominally) 5 Iyar

Yom Ha'atzmaut (יום העצמאות) is Israel's Independence Day. Observance of this day by Jews inside and outside Israel is widespread, and varies in tone from secular (military parades and barbecues) to religious (recitation of Hallel and new liturgies).

Although Israel's independence was declared on a Friday, the Chief Rabbinate has long been mindful of the possibility of Yom Ha'atzmaut (and Yom Hazikaron) observances leading to violation of Sabbath prohibitions. To prevent such violations, the dates of Yom Hazikaron and Yom Ha'atzmaut vary as follows:

- If 4–5 Iyar occur on a Sunday-Monday, the observances are delayed to Monday-Tuesday, 5–6 Iyar.
- If 4–5 Iyar occur on a Tuesday-Wednesday, the observances are not moved.
- If 4–5 Iyar occur on a Thursday-Friday, the observances are advanced to Wednesday-Thursday, 3–4 Iyar.
- If 4–5 Iyar occur on a Friday-Shabbat, the observances are advanced to Wednesday-Thursday, 2–3 Iyar.

Nearly all non-ḥaredi Jewish religious communities have incorporated changes or enhancements to the liturgy in honor of Yom Ha'atzmaut and suspend the mourning practices of the period of Sefirat Ha'Omer. (See Yom Ha'atzmaut—Religious Customs for details.) Within the Religious Zionist and Modern Orthodox communities, these changes are not without controversy, and customs continue to evolve.

Ḥaredi religious observance of Yom Ha'atzmaut varies widely. A few ḥaredim (especially Sefardic Ḥaredim) celebrate the day in a reasonably similar way to the way non-ḥaredim do. Most ḥaredim simply treat the day indifferently; i.e., as a regular day. And finally others (notably Satmar Ḥasidim and Neturei Karta) mourn on the day because of their opposition to the enterprise of the State of Israel.

=== Yom Yerushalayim—Jerusalem Day ===
- Yom Yerushalayim: 28 Iyar

Jerusalem Day (יום ירושלים) marks the 1967 reunification of Jerusalem under Israeli control during the Six-Day War. This marked the first time in 19 years that the Temple Mount was accessible to Jews, and the first time since the destruction of the Second Temple 1897 years earlier that the Temple Mount was under Jewish political control.

As with Yom Ha'atzmaut, celebrations of Yom Yerushalayim range from completely secular (including hikes to Jerusalem and a large parade through downtown Jerusalem) to religious (recitation of Hallel and new liturgies). Although Haredim do not participate in the liturgical changes, they are somewhat more likely to celebrate Yom Yerushalayim than the other modern Israeli holidays because of the importance of the liberation of the Western Wall and the Old City of Jerusalem.

Outside Israel, observance of Yom Yerushalayim is widespread, especially in Orthodox circles. It has not gained as widespread acceptance as Yom Ha'atzmaut, especially among more politically liberal Jews, because of the continuing conflicts over the future of the city.

Yom Yerushalayim has not traditionally moved to avoid Shabbat desecration, although in 2012 the Chief Rabbinate began some efforts in that direction.

=== Yom HaAliyah—Aliyah Day ===
- Yom HaAliyah: 10 Nisan

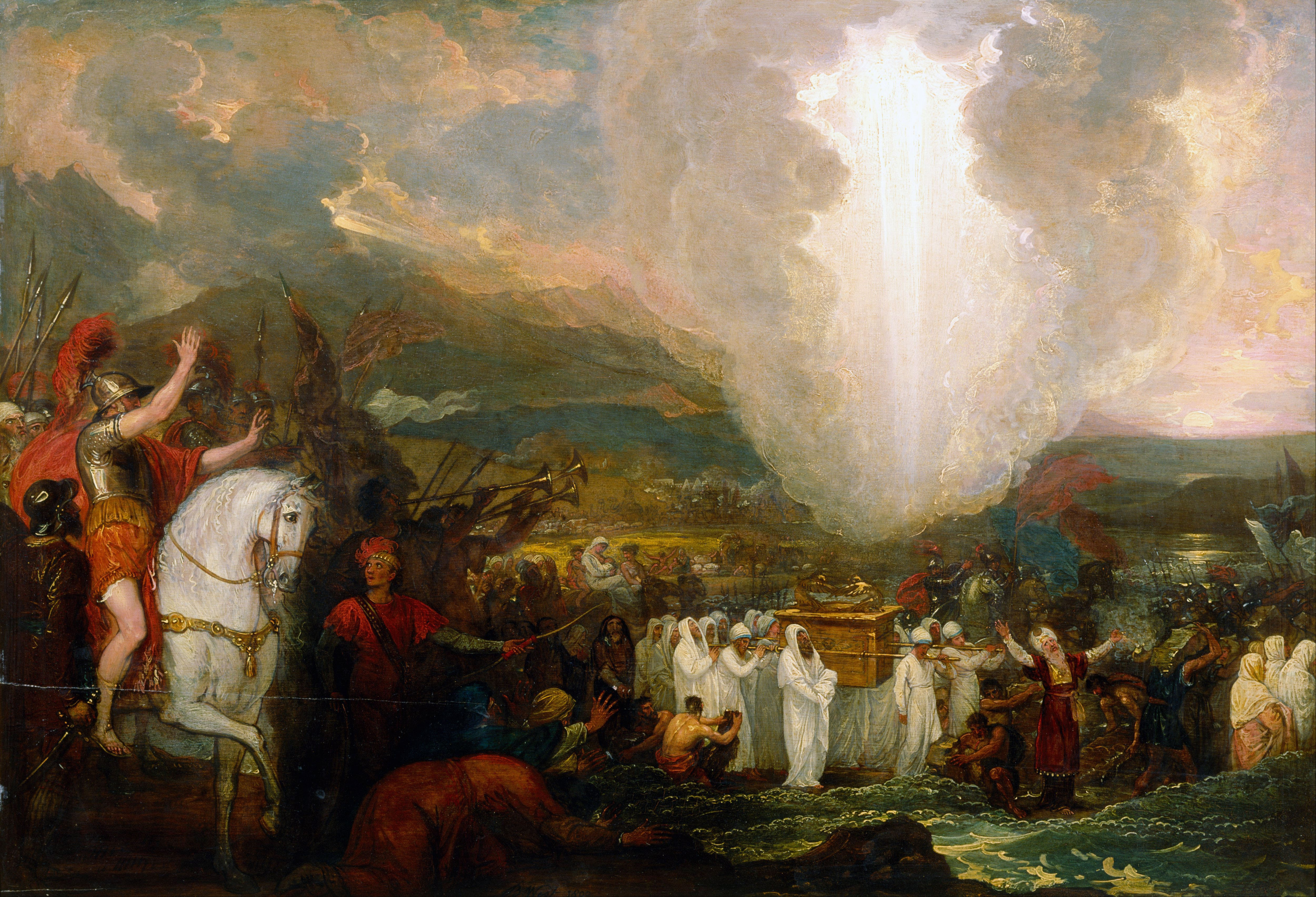
Joshua passing the River Jordan with the Ark of the Covenant by Benjamin West

Aliyah Day (יום העלייה) is an Israeli national holiday celebrated annually on the tenth of Nisan. The day was established to acknowledge Aliyah, immigration to the Jewish state, as a core value of the State of Israel, and honor the ongoing contributions of Olim (immigrants) to Israeli society.

Immigration to Israel is a recognized religious value of Judaism, sometimes referred to as the Gathering of Israel. The date chosen for Yom HaAliyah, 10 Nisan, has religious significance: it is the day on which Joshua and the Israelites crossed the Jordan River at Gilgal into the Promised Land. It was thus the first documented "mass Aliyah". The alternative date observed in the school system, 7 Heshvan, falls during the week of the Torah portion in which God instructs Abraham to leave his home and his family and go up to the Land of Israel.

At the present time, observance of this day appears to be secular in nature.

=== Day to commemorate the expulsion of Jews from Arab lands and Iran ===
- Day to Mark the Departure and Expulsion of Jews from the Arab Countries and Iran: 30 November (on the Gregorian calendar)

The Knesset established this observance in 2014. The purpose of this observance is to recognize the collective trauma of Mizrahi Jews during the period around the establishment of the State of Israel. Many Mizrachi Jews felt that their own suffering was being ignored, both in comparison to the suffering of European Jewry during the Holocaust and in comparison to the Palestinian Nakba. The Gregorian-calendar date chosen is the day after the United Nations Partition Plan for Palestine was adopted, as that date marked the beginning of concentrated pressure and hostility against the community.

At the present time, observance of this day appears to be secular in nature.

=== National Remembrance Day for October 7 attack and Gaza war ===
- 24 Tishrei (25 Tishrei if 24 Tishrei coincides with Shabbat).

The Israeli government established this national remembrance day in March 2024. It is designed to be a national remembrance day for those who died in the October 7 attacks and the Gaza war as a whole.

=== Ethnic holidays ===
The Israeli government officially recognizes three traditional holidays of ethnic Jewish communities in Israel. These days are also observed by their respective communities outside Israel.

- Mimouna began as a holiday among Moroccan Jews, while similar celebrations also exist among Turkish Jews and Persian Jews. These festivals are observed on the day after Passover, when the eating of ordinary food ("chametz") resumes. In Israel, the observance of Mimouna has spread widely in recent years; it has been estimated that up to two million Jews who live in Israel now participate in Mimouna celebrations.

On the evening concluding Passover, (Note: When this is Friday night in Israel, the celebration is deferred until after Shabbat.) the celebration centers on visiting the homes of friends and neighbors, Jewish and non-Jewish. A variety of traditional foods are served, and symbols which represent good luck and prosperity are prominently displayed. The next day, barbecues and picnics are among the most widespread activities of the celebration.

- The Seharane was celebrated by Kurdish Jews as a multi-day nature festival starting the day after Passover. Communities would leave their villages and camp out for several days, celebrating with eating and drinking, nature walks, singing and dancing.

Its observance was interrupted after the relocation of this community to Israel in the 1950s. In recent years it has been revived. But because of the already-widespread celebration of Mimouna in Israel, the celebration of the Seharane was moved to Chol HaMoed Sukkot.

- The Sigd began among the Beta Israel (Ethiopian) community as a variation of the observance of Yom Kippur. Currently that community now observes it in addition to Yom Kippur; its date is 29 Heshvan, 49 days after Yom Kippur. It shares some features of Yom Kippur, Shavuot, and other holidays.

The Sigd is modeled on a ceremony of fasting, study and prayer described in Nehemiah 8, when the Jews rededicated themselves to religious observance on return to Israel after the Babylonian exile. In Ethiopia, the community would gather on a mountaintop and pray for a return to Jerusalem. The modern Sigd is centered on a promenade overlooking the Old City of Jerusalem. The day's observance ends with a celebratory break fast.

== See also ==
- Chabad holidays
- Jewish greetings
- List of observances set by the Hebrew calendar
- List of Gregorian Jewish-related and Israeli holidays
- Religious festival
- Yom Chol, the activity days between holy days
- Yom Tov Torah readings
