= Tu BiShvat =

Jewish observance marking a new year of fruit trees

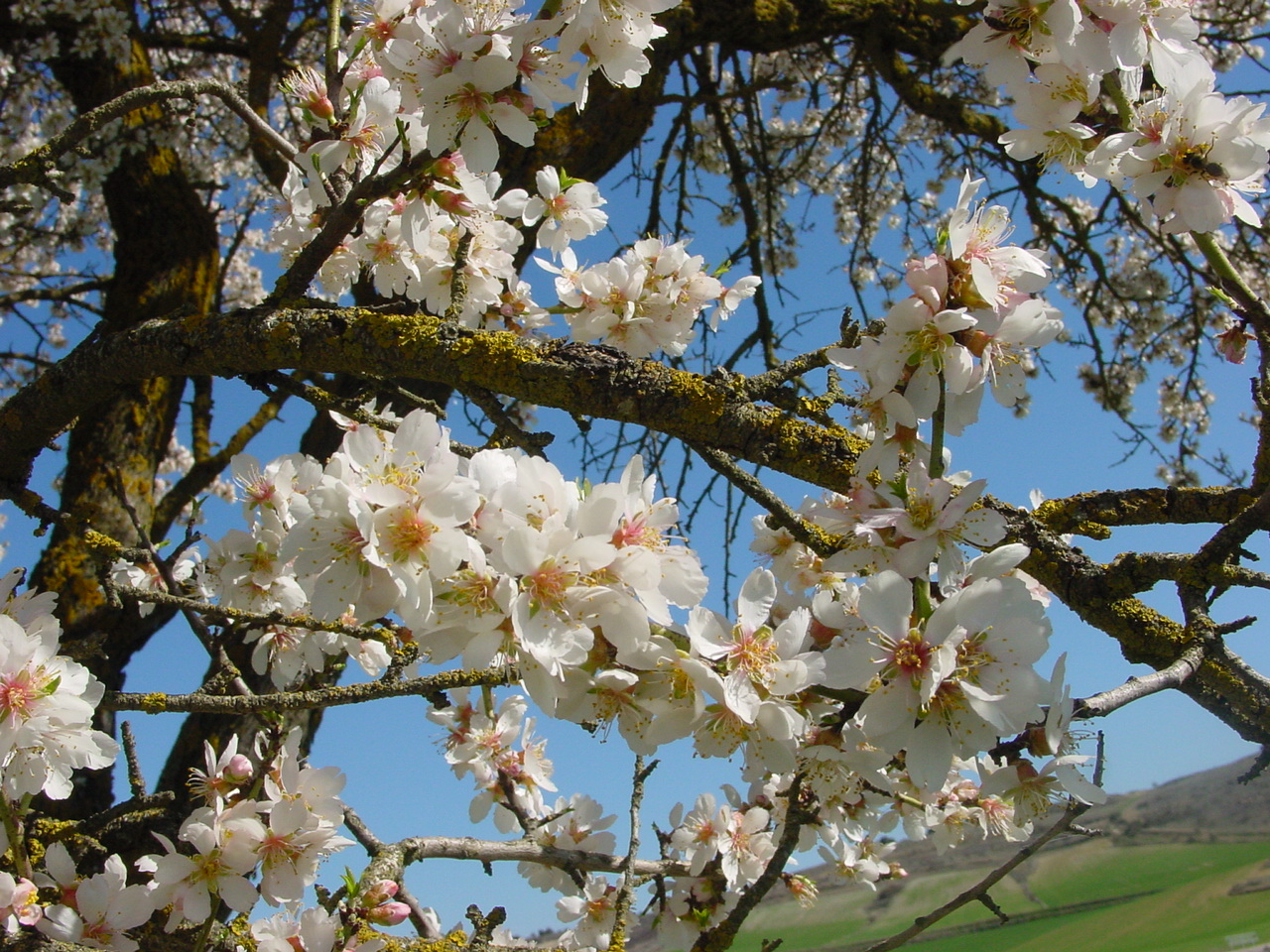
- Almond tree in blossom on Tu BiShvat
- Official name: ט״ו בִּשְׁבָט
- Type: Jewish religious, cultural
- Significance: Fruits that ripen between one Tu BiShvat to the next belong to the same agricultural year.
- Observances: Tu BiShvat seder
- Date: 15th of Shevat
- 2025 date: Sunset, 12 February – nightfall, 13 February
- 2026 date: Sunset, 1 February – nightfall, 2 February
- 2027 date: Sunset, 22 January – nightfall, 23 January
- 2028 date: Sunset, 11 February – nightfall, 12 February
- Related to: Rosh Hashanah, Arbor Day

Tu BiShvat (Hebrew: ט״ו בִּשְׁבָט, romanized: Ṭū bīŠvāṭ, lit. '15th of Shevat') is one of several New Years in the Hebrew calendar, occurring on the 15th day of the Hebrew month of Shevat. It is also called Rosh HaShanah La'Ilanot (רֹאשׁ הַשָּׁנָה לְאִילָנוֹת, 'Head [of] the Year for Trees'), since it marks the new year for fruit-bearing trees. Its original purpose in Jewish society was to distinguish one year's fruits from another in order to observe annual agricultural commandments, such as the giving of tithes. In contemporary Israel, it is celebrated as a Jewish holiday and an ecological awareness day, and trees are planted in celebration.

== Etymology ==
The name Tu BiShvat originated from the Hebrew date of the holiday- the fifteenth day of Shevat. "Tu" stands for the Hebrew letters Tet and Vav, which together have the numerical value of 9 and 6, adding up to 15. (Note: When representing the number using letters, rabbinic rules forbid using the letter-numerals that represent 10 (י Yud) and 5 (ה Hei) together because they form the abbreviation of the "ineffable name of God", YHVH יהוה. Therefore, the number 15 is represented by the letters ט (Tet) and ו (Vav), or 9 and 6, which equals 15.) The date may also be called "Ḥamisha Asar BiShvat" (חמשה-עשר בשבט, 'Fifteenth of Shevat').

== Talmud ==
Tu BiShvat appears in the Mishnah in Tractate Rosh Hashanah as one of the four new years in the Jewish calendar. The discussion of when the New Year occurs was a source of debate among the rabbis, who argued:

- The first of Nisan is the "new year for kings and festivals".
- The first of Elul is the "new year for the tithe of cattle"; the tannaim Eleazar ben Shammua and Shimon bar Yochai, however, place this on the first of Tishrei.
- The first of Tishrei is the "new year for years" (calculation of the calendar), "for release years" (sabbatical-Shmita years), jubilees, planting, and for the tithe of vegetables.
- The first of Shevat is the "new year for trees" according to the school of Shammai; the school of Hillel, however, place this on the fifteenth of Shevat.

The rabbis ruled in favor of Hillel on this issue and the 15th of Shevat became the date for calculating the beginning of the agricultural cycle for the purpose of biblical tithes.

== Biblical tithes ==
- Orlah refers to a biblical prohibition (Leviticus 19:23) on eating the fruit of trees produced during the first three years after they are planted.
- Neta Reva'i refers to the biblical commandment (Leviticus 19:24) to bring fourth-year fruit crops to Jerusalem as a tithe.
- The second tithe was a tithe which was collected in Jerusalem and the poor tithe was a tithe given to the poor (Deuteronomy 14:22–29), which were also calculated by whether the fruit ripened before or after Tu BiShvat.

Of the talmudic requirements for fruit trees which used Tu BiShvat as the cut-off date in the Hebrew calendar for calculating the age of a fruit-bearing tree, the orlah remains to this day in essentially the same form it had in talmudic times. In the Orthodox Jewish world, these practices are still observed today as part of Halakha, Jewish law. Fruit that ripened on a three-year-old tree before Tu BiShvat is considered orlah and is forbidden to eat, while fruit ripening on or after Tu BiShvat of the tree's third year is permitted. In the 1st, 2nd, 4th and 5th years of the Shmita cycle, the second tithe is observed today by a ceremony redeeming tithing obligations with a coin; in the 3rd and 6th years, the poor tithe is substituted, and no coin is needed for redeeming it. Tu BiShvat is the cut-off date for determining to which year the tithes belong.

Tu BiShvat falls on the 15th day of the Hebrew month of Shevat and begins a three-month series (in years without a leap year) of holidays that occur on the mid-month full moons that culminate in Passover.

== Traditional practices ==
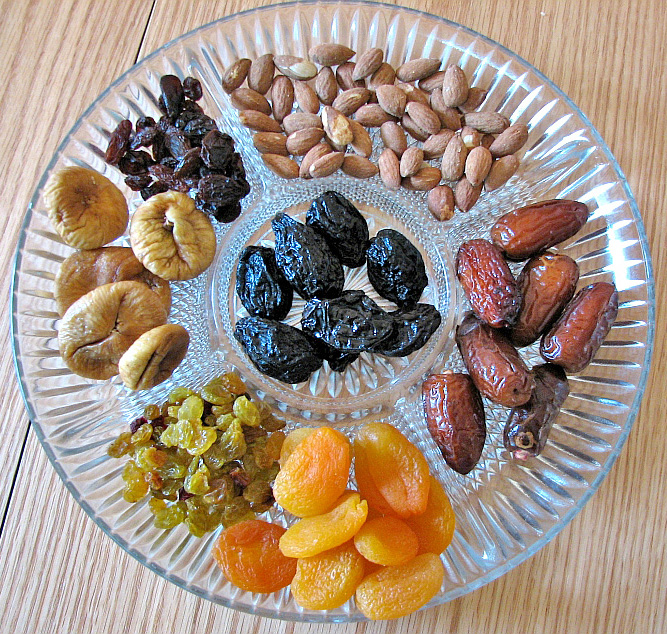
Dried fruit and almonds traditionally eaten on Tu BiShvat

In the Middle Ages, Tu BiShvat was celebrated with a feast of fruits in keeping with the Mishnaic description of the holiday as a "New Year." In the 16th century, the kabbalist Rabbi Yitzchak Luria of Safed and his disciples instituted a Tu BiShvat seder in which the fruits and trees of the Land of Israel, especially of the Seven Species, were given symbolic meaning. The main idea was that eating ten specific fruits and drinking four cups of wine in a specific order while reciting the appropriate blessings would bring human beings, and the world, closer to spiritual perfection.

In Israel, the kabbalistic Tu BiShvat seder has been revived, and is now celebrated by many Jews, religious and secular. Special haggadot have been written for this purpose.

In the Hasidic community, some Jews pickle or candy the etrog (citron) from Sukkot and eat it on Tu BiShvat. Some pray that they will be worthy of a beautiful etrog on the following Sukkot.

Sephardic Jews prepare a dessert made of grains, dried fruits, and nuts, known as Ashure or trigo koço, to celebrate the holiday. Another custom involves drinking both red and white wines to symbolise the transition from winter to spring.

== Modern customs ==
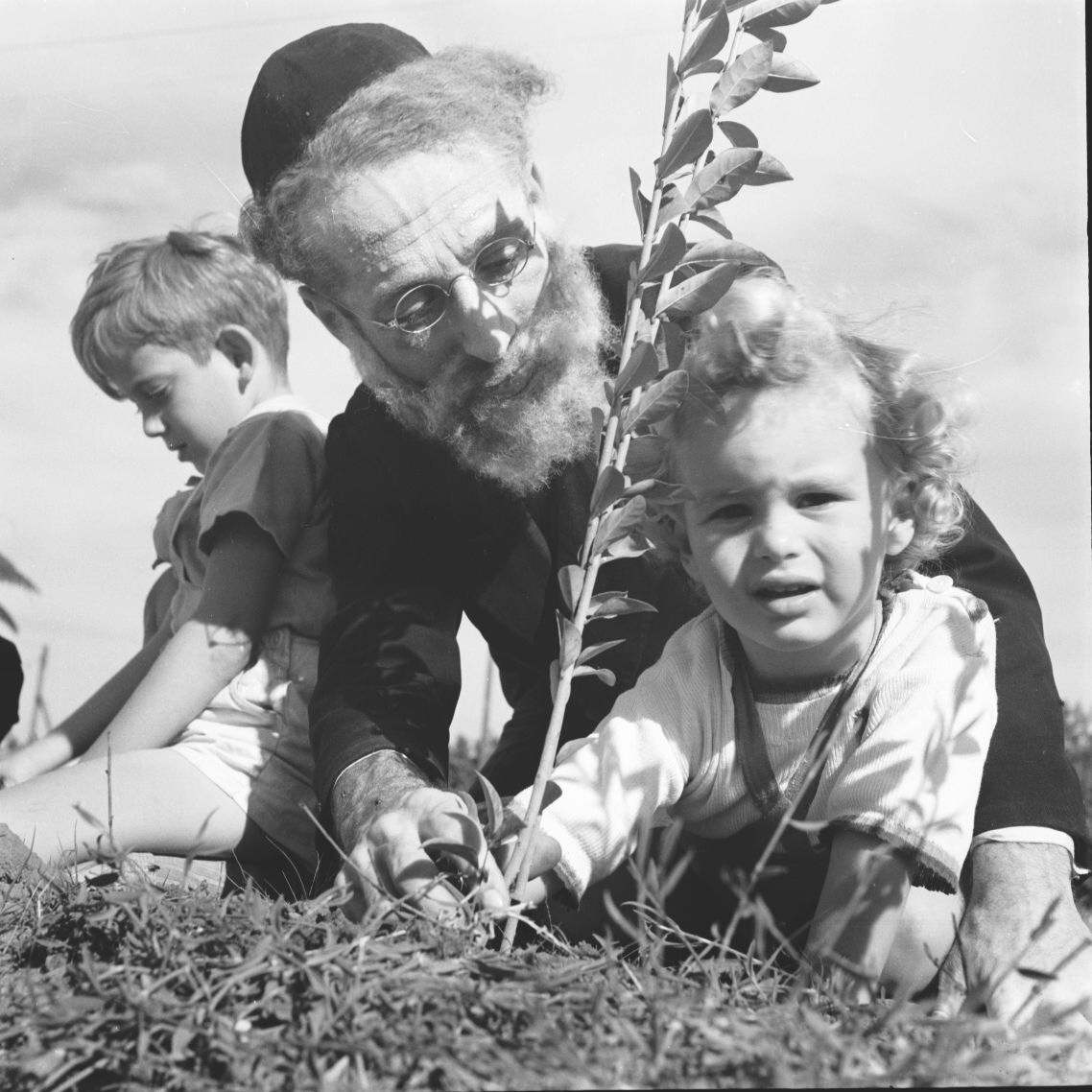
Planting trees for Tu BiShvat, 1945. Photographer: Zoltan Kluger

On Tu BiShvat 1890, Rabbi Ze'ev Yavetz, one of the founders of the Mizrachi religious Zionist movement, took his students to plant trees in the agricultural town of Zikhron Ya'akov. This custom was adopted in 1908 by the Jewish Teachers Union and later by the Jewish National Fund, established in 1901 to oversee land reclamation and afforestation of the Land of Israel. In the early 20th century, the Jewish National Fund devoted the day to planting eucalyptus trees to stop the plague of malaria in the Hula Valley.

Ecological organizations in Israel and the diaspora have adopted the holiday to further environmental-awareness programs. Tu BiShvat is often referred to as the Israeli Arbor Day. The Jewish National Fund schedules major tree-planting events in large forests every Tu BiShvat, and over a million Israelis take part in its Tu BiShvat tree-planting activities. On Israeli kibbutzim, Tu BiShvat is celebrated as an agricultural holiday.

In keeping with the idea of Tu BiShvat marking the revival of nature, many of Israel's major institutions have chosen this day for their inauguration. The cornerstone-laying of the Hebrew University of Jerusalem took place on Tu BiShvat 1918; the Technion in Haifa, on Tu BiShvat 1925; and the Knesset, on Tu BiShvat 1949.

In the diaspora, starting especially in North America in the 1980s, Tu BiShvat became treated as the Jewish "Earth Day" – with contemporary communities emphasizing all kinds of actions and activism related to the environment and the natural world.

== See also ==
- Hebrew numerals
- List of Jewish prayers and blessings
- Judaism and environmentalism
- Judges 9
- Lantern Festival, full moon of the first month of the Chinese calendar
