= Tu BiShvat seder =

Jewish holiday celebration

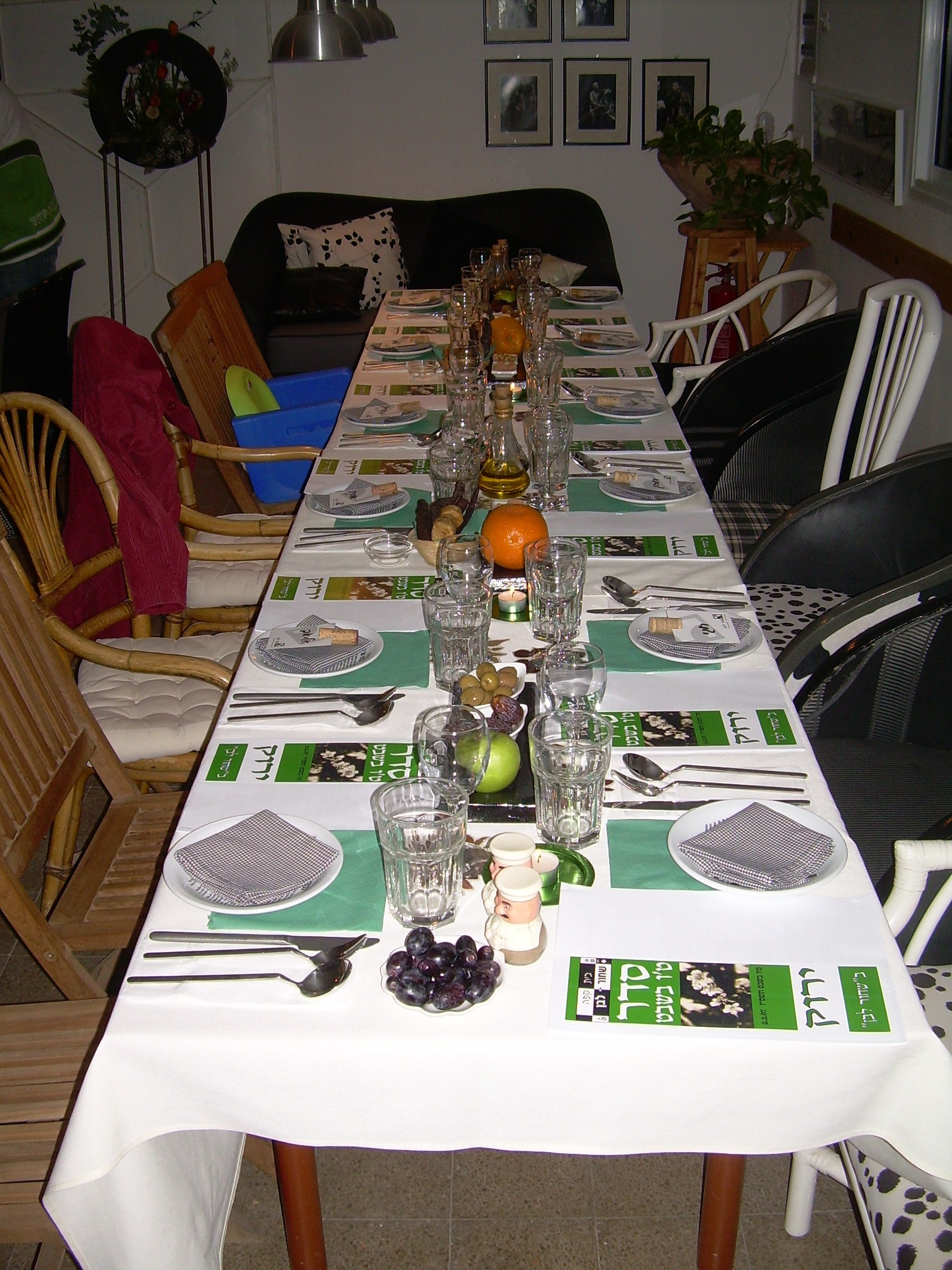
Tu BiShvat seder table

A Tu BiShvat seder is a festive ceremony, often accompanied by a meal featuring fruits in honor of the Jewish holiday of Tu BiShvat.

During the Middle Ages or possibly a little before that, this day started to be celebrated with a minor ceremony of eating fruits, since the Mishnah called it "Rosh Hashanah" ("New Year"), and that was later understood as being a time appropriate for celebration.

== History ==
In the 16th century in the Land of Israel, Rabbi Yitzchak Luria of Safed and his disciples created a Tu BiShvat seder, somewhat like the Passover seder, that celebrated the Tree of Life (the Kabbalistic map of the Sephirot). The earliest published version of this seder is called the P'ri Eitz Hadar, which means "The Fruit of the Beautiful Tree". The seder evokes Kabbalistic themes of restoring cosmic blessing by strengthening and repairing the Tree of Life, generally using the framework of the Four Worlds of emanation that can be roughly mapped onto the physical metaphor of a tree, that is, roots, trunk, branches and leaves. In conjunction with this practice, some Chassidic Jews eat etrog on this day.

The traditional Tu BiShvat seder ended with a prayer which states in part, "May all the sparks scattered by our hands, or by the hands of our ancestors, or by the sin of the first human against the fruit of the tree, be returned and included in the majestic might of the Tree of Life."

Historically, during the Tu BiShvat seder, Sephardic Jews in the Land of Israel consumed fruits, a sweet wheat pudding called ashure, and drank both red and white wines to symbolize the transition from winter to spring.

== Customary fruits ==
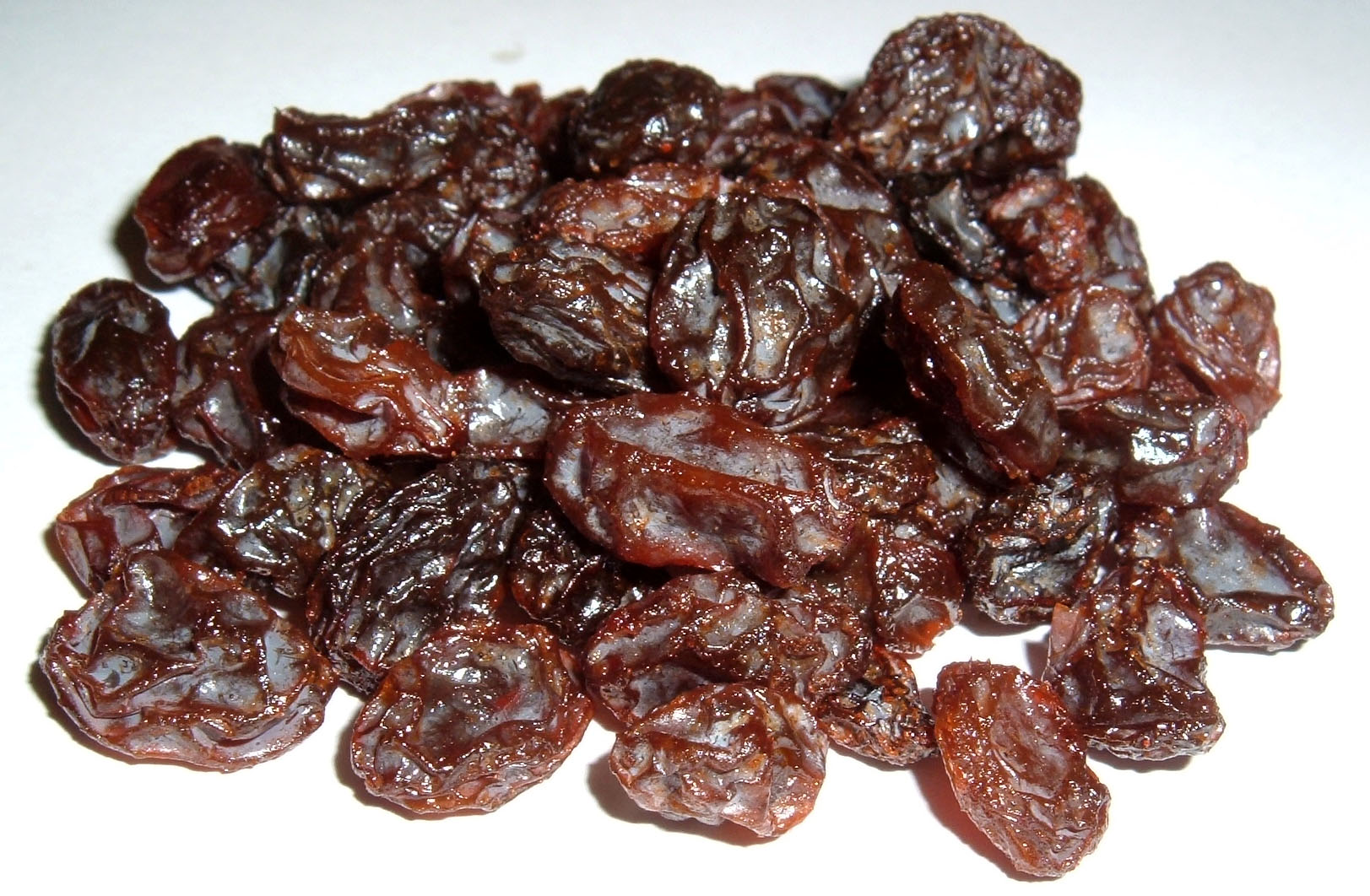
Raisins

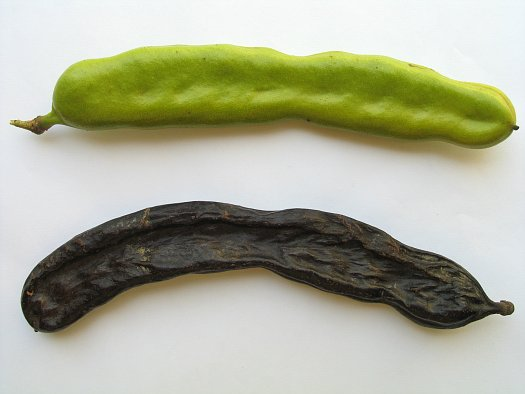
Dried carob is often eaten on Tu BiShvat, although it is not one of the Seven Species of the Land of Israel.

While some version of the Kabbalistic order is often followed in eating fruits and nuts on Tu BiShvat, it is generally customary to eat dried fruits and nuts even among those who are not following the Kabbalistic rite. Figs, dates, raisins, carob, and almonds are especially popular. Many people also incorporate into their seders the Seven Species associated with the Land of Israel in the Torah, which according to Deuteronomy 8:8 are wheat, barley, grapes, figs, pomegranates, olives and dates.

In Kabbalistic terms, the fruits that one eats, dried or fresh, can be divided up from lower or more manifest to higher or more spiritual, as follows:

- Fruits and nuts with hard, inedible exteriors and soft edible insides, such as oranges, bananas, walnuts, and pistachios. Note that some count oranges and other citrus as wholly edible, in keeping with the interpretation of the etrog as being on the highest level.
- Fruits and nuts with soft exteriors, but with a hard pit inside, such as dates, apricots, olives and persimmons
- Fruit that is eaten whole, such as figs and berries.

Kabbalistic tradition teaches that eating fruits in this order creates a connection with the Tree of Life that God placed in the Garden of Eden, as mentioned in the Book of Genesis, where Adam and Eve had been placed after their creation, which is also represented by the Sephirot. In effect one is traveling from the most external or manifest dimension of reality, symbolized by fruits with a shell, to the most inner dimension, symbolized not even by the completely edible fruits but rather by a fourth level that may be likened to smell. At the same time, one drinks various proportions of red and white grape juice or wine, from white to red with just a drop of white in it, also corresponding to these stages.

== Ecological interpretation ==
While the Tu BiShvat seder started as a kabbalistic way to celebrate the holiday, some ecologically-minded Jews have decided to resurrect the custom of having a Tu BiShvat seder to reflect issues and themes related to ecological or Zionist interpretations of the day. In the style of a Passover seder, some friends might be invited to the house, where various symbolic fruits and other foods are eaten, along with wine or grape juice. Many seders follow the Kabbalistic framework of the Four Worlds as well, often giving them a contemporary spin in terms of (physical, emotional, intellectual and spiritual) meaning, or reinterpreting them culturally (social, cosmic, national, ecological). Seders might also concentrate on one aspect of one theme.

The ecological interpretation of Tu BiShvat seder can be dated to the 1970s, emerging to some degree out of the awareness that was engendered by a Jewish campaign of protest against U.S. use of Agent Orange called "Trees for Vietnam". One of the earlier ecologically-themed Tu BiShvat seders, created by Jonathan Wolf, incorporated information from groups like Society for the Protection of Nature in Israel (SPNI) and the JNF directly into the Kabbalistic framework. More recent ecological interpretations of the seder include the idea that the Four Worlds and the types of fruit eaten represent levels of symbiosis between people and trees, or that the Tree of Life in Kabbalah can be mapped onto the evolutionary Tree of Life.
