= Shevat =

11th month of the Hebrew calendar

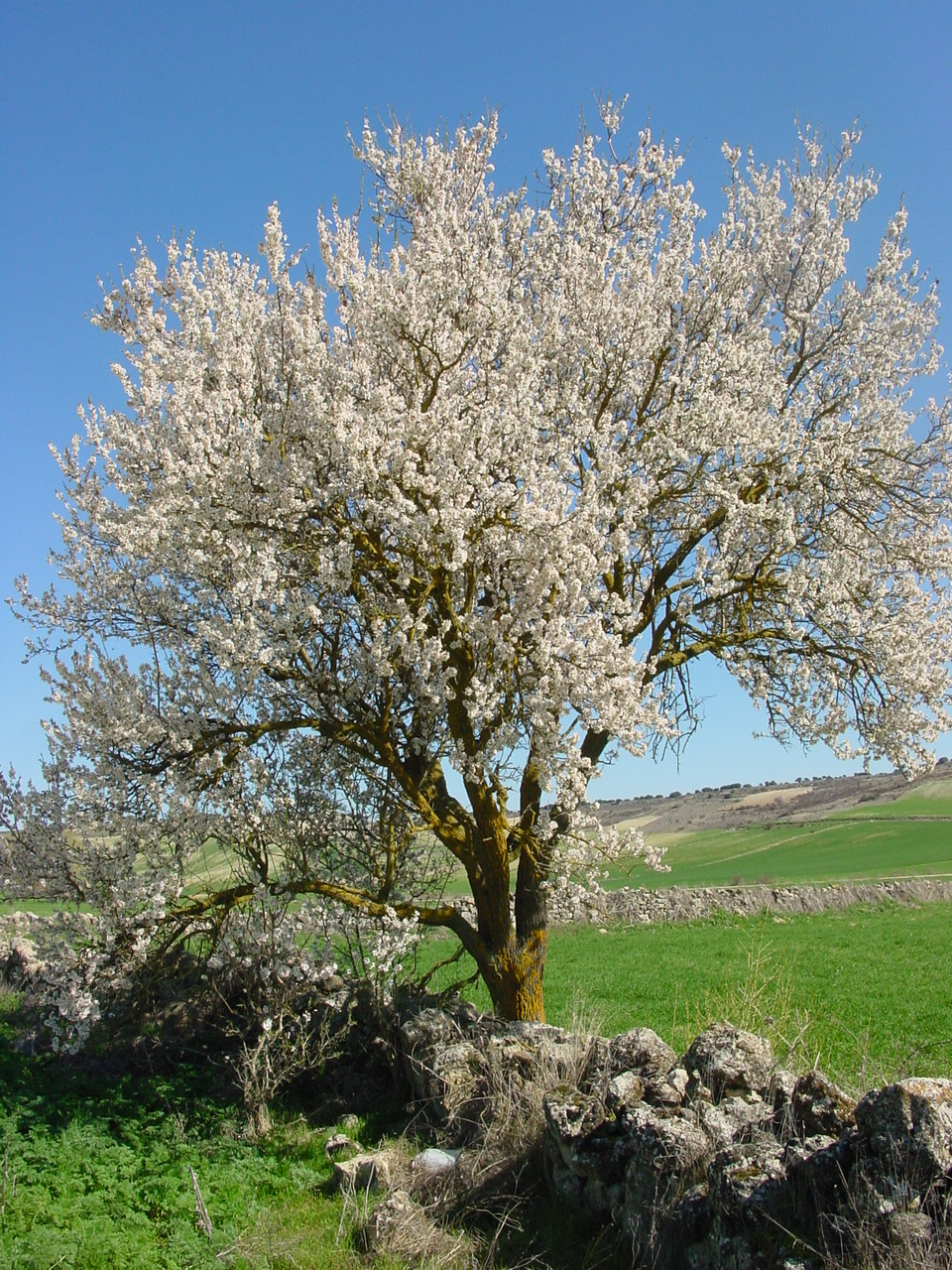
- Tu Bishvat, the New Year of the Trees, occurs on the 15th of Shevat, which coincides with the flowering of the almond tree in Israel.
- Native name: שְׁבָט (Hebrew)
- Calendar: Hebrew calendar
- Month number: 11
- Number of days: 30
- Season: Winter (Northern Hemisphere)
- Gregorian equivalent: January–February
- Significant days: Tu Bishvat

Shevat (Hebrew: שְׁבָט, Standard Šəvaṭ, Tiberian Šeḇāṭ; from Akkadian: Šabātu) is the fifth month of the civil year starting in Tishre (or Tishri) and the eleventh month of the ecclesiastical year on the Hebrew calendar starting in Nisan. It is a month of 30 days. Shevat usually occurs in January–February on the Gregorian calendar.

The name of the month was taken from the Akkadian language during the Babylonian Captivity. The assumed Akkadian origin of the month is Šabātu, meaning "strike", that refers to the heavy rains of the season. In Biblical sources, the month is first mentioned by this name in the book of prophet Zechariah (Zechariah 1:7).

== Holidays ==
- 15 Shevat – Tu Bishvat

== In Jewish history and tradition ==
- 1 Shevat – Moses repeats the Torah (Deuteronomy 1:3)
- 2 Shevat (c. 1628 BC) – Asher born
- 5 Shevat - The First Knesset convenes for the first time in Jerusalem, formally inaugurating Israel’s parliamentary democracy after the War of Independence.
- 9 Shevat (1885) - The Pittsburgh Platform is adopted by Reform Jewish leaders in the United States, redefining Reform Judaism’s stance on ritual law, nationalism, and messianism
- 10 Shevat (1950) - Death of the Previous Rebbe, the 6th Chabad Rebbe.
- 17-18 Shevat — the minor Purim of Saragossa, where the Jews of Saragossa were saved from destruction at the hand of an informant.
- 22 Shevat (1998) - Death of the Rebbetzin, the wife of the 7th Chabad Rebbe.
- 24 Shevat (517 BC) – Zechariah's prophecy (Zechariah 1:7–16)
- 28 Shevat (c. 134 BC) – Antiochus V abandoned his siege of Jerusalem and his plans for the city's destruction. This day was observed as a holiday in Hasmonean times. (Megilat Taanit)

== See also ==
- Babylonian calendar, where the month's name was Araḫ Šabaṭu
- Jewish astrology
- Šubāṭ (Arabic: شباط) [ʃ(ʊ)bɑːtˤ] and Şubat [ʃuˈbat] is the name for the month of February in Arabic and Turkish.
- Magha is the name of the equivalent month in the Hindu Calendar
