= List of observances set by the Hebrew calendar =

All observances begin at sunset the day prior to the Gregorian date listed unless otherwise noted, and end on nightfall of the date in question, which is defined as the appearance of three stars in the sky. On leap years (which occur every 2–3 years) an extra month, Adar II, is added and certain holidays move accordingly, and it is mentioned in the notes section. All fasts other than Yom Kippur and Tisha b'Av begin at dawn of the day listed.

== Holidays for the Jewish calendar year of 5786 (2025–2026) ==
Yom tov for the Three Pilgrimage Festivals (Pesach, Shavuot, and Sukkot) is observed for 1 day in Israel and in Reform and most Reconstructionist communities around the world, and is observed for 2 days in Orthodox and most Conservative communities outside Israel, because of yom tov sheni shel galuyot. In the table, these are referred to as 1-day and 2-day communities.

Date on Hebrew calendar	Gregorian date	Hebrew Name	Notes
1-2 Tishrei	September 23–24, 2025	Rosh Hashanah	Public holiday in Israel
1-10 Tishrei	September 23–October 2, 2025	Ten Days of Repentance	
3 Tishrei	September 25, 2025	Fast of Gedalia	Public holiday in Israel, changes to Tishrei 4 when Tishrei 3 is Shabbat. Starts at dawn.
Movable	September 26, 2025	Shabbat Shuvah (Sabbath of Return, or Sabbath of Repentance)	Shabbat between Rosh Hashanah and Yom Kippur
9 Tishrei	October 1, 2025	Erev Yom Kippur	Yom Kippur Eve
10 Tishrei	October 2, 2025	Yom Kippur	Public holiday in Israel. Unlike other fasting days, this does not move to avoid interfering with Shabbat.
14 Tishrei	October 6, 2025	Erev Sukkot	Sukkot Eve
Movable	October 11, 2025	Shabbat Chol Hamoed Sukkot	
15-21 Tishrei	October 7–13, 2025	Sukkot	One of the Three Pilgrimage Festivals, public holiday in Israel
16-21 Tishrei (1-day communities) / 17-21 Tishrei (2-day communities)	October 8–13, 2025/ October 9–13, 2025	Chol HaMoed Sukkot	Public holiday in Israel. Seharane is celebrated by Kurdish Jews during this time, but only in the State of Israel. Outside of Israel Seharane is celebrated after Passover.
21 Tishrei	October 13, 2025	Hoshanah Rabbah	
22 Tishrei	October 14, 2025	Shemini Atzeret	Public holiday in Israel. Includes Simchat Torah in 1-day communities.
23 Tishrei	October 15, 2025	Simchat Torah	2-day communities only
Movable	October 18, 2025	Shabbat Mevorchim	Shabbat preceding and beginning a week containing a Rosh Chodesh
1 Cheshvan	October 19, 2025	Rosh Chodesh of Cheshvan	
Movable	October 27, 2025	Bahab	First Monday of Cheshvan, starts at dawn (optional)
Movable	October 30, 2025	Bahab	First Thursday of Cheshvan after the first Monday, starts at dawn.(optional)
Movable	November 3, 2025	Bahab	Monday following first Thursday of Cheshvan, starts at dawn. (optional)
7 Cheshvan	October 29, 2025	V'tein Tal u-Matar ("Deliver Dew and Rain")	This is a prayer added to the Shemoneh Esrei prayers in Israel. If no rain has fallen by the 17th of Cheshvan, special prayers are added for rain
7 Cheshvan	October 29, 2025	Yom HaAliyah	Observed in Israeli schools on 7 Cheshvan with 10 Nisan being the public holiday in Israel.
12 Cheshvan	November 3, 2025	Rabin Day	Public holiday in Israel
Movable	November 15, 2025	Shabbat Mevorchim	Shabbat preceding and beginning a week containing a Rosh Chodesh
29 Cheshvan	November 20, 2025	Sigd	Public holiday in Israel
1 Kislev	November 21, 2025	Rosh Chodesh of Kislev	In years when Cheshvan has 30 days, this also includes 30 Cheshvan.
1 Kislev	November 21, 2025	1 Kislev	Non Rosh Chodesh related observance, Chabad sect only
6 Kislev	November 26, 2025	Ben-Gurion Day	Public holiday in Israel
9 Kislev	November 29, 2025	9 Kislev	Chabad sect only
10 Kislev	November 30, 2025	10 Kislev	Chabad sect only
19 Kislev	December 9, 2025	19 Kislev	Chabad sect only
23 Kislev	December 13, 2025	Teacher's Day in Israel	
Movable	December 20, 2025	Shabbat Mevorchim	Shabbat preceding and beginning a week containing a Rosh Chodesh
25 Kislev— 2 Tevet	December 15–22, 2025	Hanukkah	Public holiday in Israel. Ends 3 Tevet if Kislev is short.
1 Tevet	December 21, 2025	Rosh Chodesh of Tevet	
5 Tevet	December 25, 2025	5 Tevet	Chabad sect only
10 Tevet	December 30, 2025	Tenth of Tevet	Public holiday in Israel. Starts at dawn.
Movable	January 17, 2026	Shabbat Mevorchim	Shabbat preceding and beginning a week containing a Rosh Chodesh
29 Tevet	January 18, 2026	Yom Kippur Katan	Optional. If Yom Kippur Katan falls on a Friday or Saturday, it is moved to the preceding Thursday to avoid interfering with Shabbat. Starts at dawn.
1 Shevat	January 19, 2026	Rosh Chodesh of Shevat	
10 Shevat	January 28, 2026	10 Shevat	Chabad sect only
Movable	January 31, 2026	Shabbat Shirah	Shabbat that falls on or before Tu BiShvat
15 Shevat	February 2, 2026	Tu BiShvat	Public holiday in Israel
22 Shevat	February 9, 2026	22 Shevat	Chabad sect only
Movable	February 14, 2026	Shabbat Shekalim	Shabbat on or before Rosh Chodesh Adar (or Adar II in leap years)
29 Shevat	February 16, 2026	Yom Kippur Katan	Optional. If Yom Kippur Katan falls on a Friday or Saturday, it is moved to the preceding Thursday to avoid interfering with Shabbat. Starts at dawn.
1 Adar	February 18, 2026	Rosh Chodesh of Adar	
7 Adar	February 24, 2026	Seventh of Adar	Starts at dawn. On Adar II on leap years, Adar I on non-leap years
Movable	February 28, 2026	Shabbat Zachor	Shabbat immediately preceding Purim. On leap years, this falls on the 1st of Adar II, or on the 1st of Adar II itself if it is Shabbat. Adar I on non-leap years.
13 Adar	March 2, 2026	Fast of Esther	Public holiday in Israel. Starts at dawn. Can be moved to avoid conflict with the Sabbath. On Adar II on leap years, Adar I on non-leap years.
14 Adar	Not celebrated	Purim Katan	Minor Purim celebration on Adar I during leap years. Purim itself is celebrated in Adar II.
14 Adar	March 3, 2026	Purim	Public holiday in Israel On Adar II on leap years, Adar I on non-leap years.
15 Adar	March 4, 2026	Shushan Purim	On Adar II on leap years, Adar I on non-leap years.
Movable	March 7, 2026	Shabbat Parah	Shabbat preceding Shabbat HaChodesh
29 Adar	March 18, 2026	Yom Kippur Katan	Optional. If Yom Kippur Katan falls on a Friday or Saturday, it is moved to the preceding Thursday to avoid interfering with Shabbat. Starts at dawn.
Movable	March 14, 2026	Shabbat HaChodesh	Shabbat on or immediately preceding Rosh Chodesh of Nisan
1 Nisan	March 19, 2026	Rosh Chodesh of Nisan	This is also the New Year for the reigns of Jewish kings (in line with the national emphasis of the season), the renting of houses, and the counting involved in the prohibition against delaying the fulfillment of vows.
10 Nisan	March 28, 2026	Yom HaAliyah	Public holiday in Israel
11 Nisan	March 29, 2026	11 Nisan	(Chabad sect only)
11 Nisan	March 29, 2026	Education and Sharing Day	United States
14 Nisan	April 1, 2026	Fast of the Firstborn	on 12 Nisan when the 14th falls on Sabbath
Movable	March 28, 2026	Shabbat HaGadol	Shabbat immediately preceding Passover
15-21 Nisan (1-day communities) / 15-22 Nisan (2-day communities)	April 2-8, 2026/ April 2-9, 2026	Passover	Public holiday in Israel. One of the Three Pilgrimage Festivals.
16-20 Nisan (1-day communities) / 17-20 Nisan (2-day communities)	April 3-7, 2026 / April 4-7, 2026	Chol HaMoed Pesach	Public holiday in Israel.
Movable	April 4, 2026	Shabbat Chol Hamoed Pesach	
21 Nisan	April 8, 2026	Shvi'i shel Pesach	Public holiday in Israel.
Movable	April 12–19, 2026	Days of Remembrance of the Victims of the Holocaust	United States, Sunday before Yom Hashoah to following Sunday
22 Nisan (1-day communities) / 23 Nisan (2-day communities)	April 9, 2026 / April 10, 2026	Mimouna	Public holiday in Israel
16 Nisan - 5 Sivan	Sunset, April 2 – nightfall, May 5, 2026	Counting the Omer	
23 Nisan	April 13, 2026	Seharane	Seharane is celebrated by Kurdish Jews outside of Israel on this date. In the state of Israel, it is celebrated on Chol HaMoed Sukkot. (see entry for that holiday)
23 Nisan (22 Nisan within Israel)	April 13, 2026 (April 12, 2026)	Shab Shal	Iranian Jews, end of Passover holiday.
27 Nisan	April 14, 2026	Yom HaShoah	Public holiday in Israel. Moved to 26 or 28 Nisan when the 27th falls on Friday or Sunday respectively, interfering with Shabbat.
Movable	April 11, 2026	Shabbat Mevorchim	Shabbat preceding and beginning a week containing a Rosh Chodesh
1 Iyar	April 11, 2026	Rosh Chodesh of Iyar	
2 Iyar	April 12, 2026	2 Iyar	Chabad sect only.
First Thursday of Iyar	April 23, 2026	Bahab	(optional)
4 Iyar	April 21, 2026	Yom Hazikaron	Public holiday in Israel. Might be moved to avoid conflict with Independence Day (Israel) or Shabbat.
5 Iyar	April 22, 2026	Day to Praise	Same day as Independence Day (Israel), see next entry.
5 Iyar	April 22, 2026	Independence Day (Israel)	Public holiday in Israel. Might be moved to avoid conflict with Yom Hazikaron or Shabbat.
First Monday of Iyar	April 20, 2026	Bahab	(optional)
Monday following first Thursday of Iyar	April 27, 2026	Bahab	(optional)
10 Iyar	April 27, 2026	Herzl Day	Public holiday in Israel.
14 Iyar	May 1, 2026	Pesach Sheni	
18 Iyar	May 5, 2026	Lag Ba'omer	Public holiday in Israel.
28 Iyar	May 15, 2026	Fast of Samuel	Fast is optional and is generally only observed by Chevra kadisha. Starts at dawn.
28 Iyar	May 15, 2026	Jerusalem Day	Public holiday in Israel.
29 Iyar	May 16, 2026	Yom Kippur Katan	Optional. If Yom Kippur Katan falls on a Friday or Saturday, it is moved to the preceding Thursday to avoid interfering with Shabbat. Starts at dawn.
1 Sivan	May 17, 2026	Rosh Chodesh of Sivan	
6 Sivan (1-day communities) / 6-7 Sivan (2-day communities)	May 22, 2026/ May 22–23, 2026	Shavuot	One of the Three Pilgrimage Festivals. Public holiday in Israel.
20 Sivan	June 5, 2026	Fast of the Khmelnytsky massacres	Not widely observed
29 Sivan	June 14, 2026	Yom Kippur Katan	Optional. If Yom Kippur Katan falls on a Friday or Saturday, it is moved to the preceding Thursday to avoid interfering with Shabbat. Starts at dawn.
1 Tammuz	June 16, 2026	Rosh Chodesh of Tammuz	
3 Tammuz	June 18, 2026	3 Tammuz	Chabad sect only
12-13 Tammuz	June 27–28, 2026	12-13 Tammuz	Chabad sect only
17 Tammuz	July 2, 2026	Seventeenth of Tammuz	Can be moved to avoid interfering with Shabbat. Public holiday in Israel.
17 Tammuz - 9 Av	July 2-23, 2026	The Three Weeks	
29 Tammuz	July 14, 2026	Jabotinsky Day	Public holiday in Israel.
29 Tammuz	July 14, 2026	Yom Kippur Katan	Optional. If Yom Kippur Katan falls on a Friday or Saturday, it is moved to the preceding Thursday to avoid interfering with Shabbat. Starts at dawn.
1 Av	July 15, 2026	Rosh Chodesh of Av	
1 Av - 9 Av	July 15-July 23, 2026	The Nine Days	
Movable	July 18, 2026	Shabbat Chazon	Shabbat immediately prior to Tisha B'Av
9 Av	July 23, 2026	Tisha B'Av	Public holiday in Israel
15 Av	July 29, 2026	Tu B'Av	Public holiday in Israel.
Movable	July 25, 2026	Shabat Nachamu	Shabbat immediately following Tisha B'av
30 Av	August 13, 2026	Yom Kippur Katan	Optional. If Yom Kippur Katan falls on a Friday or Saturday, it is moved to the preceding Thursday to avoid interfering with Shabbat. Starts at dawn.
1 Elul	August 14, 2026	Rosh Hashanah LeMa'sar Behemah and Rosh Chodesh of Elul	
15 Elul	August 28, 2026	15 Elul	Chabad sect only
18 Elul	August 31, 2026	Chai Elul	Chabad sect only
Movable	September 5, 2026	Leil Selichot prayers begin under Ashkenazic tradition	These prayers begin on the Saturday night before Rosh Hashanah. If, however, the first day of Rosh Hashanah falls on Monday or Tuesday, the prayers are begun the Saturday night prior to ensure that Selichot are recited at least four times.
29 Elul	September 11, 2026	Erev Rosh Hashanah	

== Non-annual observances ==
- Jewish calendar year 5782 - Shmita - September 7, 2021 - September 25, 2022 (Observed every seven years)
- Jewish calendar year 5783 - Hakhel - Observed every seven years, comes after Shimita year.
- Purim Meshulash - Rare calendar occurrence when Purim in Jerusalem falls on Shabbat. The next time this will happen is 2021.
- Purim Katan - Minor Purim celebration on Adar I during leap years. Purim itself is celebrated in Adar II. The next time this will happen is the Jewish year 5782, on February 14, 2022.
- 23 Nisan 5797 - Birkat Hachama - April 8, 2037 (Observed every 28 years)

== See also ==
- Jewish astrology
- List of Gregorian Jewish-related and Israeli holidays
