= Yahrzeit =

Death anniversary in Judaism

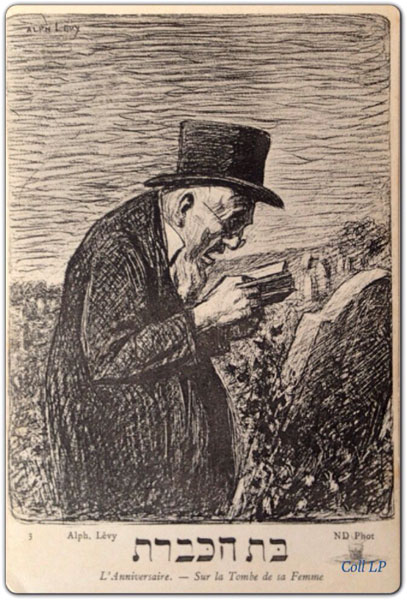
This drawing by Alphonse Lévy (1843–1918) shows a man marking his wife's yahrzeit at her grave.

Yahrzeit (pronounced [/ˈjɑrtsaɪt/]; Yiddish: יאָרצײַט, romanized: yortsayt, lit. 'year-time'; pl. יאָרצײַטן, yortsaytn; Hebrew: יארצייט) is the anniversary of a death in Judaism. It is traditionally commemorated by reciting the Mourner's Kaddish during Jewish prayer services and by lighting a 24-hour Yahrzeit candle in the synagogue and/or at home.

== Name ==
The word Yahrzeit is a borrowing from the Yiddish yortsayt (יאָרצײַט), ultimately from the Middle High German jārzīt. It is a doublet of the English word yeartide. Use of the word to refer to a Jewish death anniversary dates to at least the 15th century, appearing in the writings of Shalom of Neustadt, Isaac of Tyrnau, and Moses Mintz. Mordecai Jafe also uses the term in his 1612 work Levush ha-Tekehlet.

Though of Yiddish origin, many Sephardic and Mizraḥi communities adopted the word, which likely spread through rabbinic literature. Variants of the word are found in Judeo-Arabic (yarṣayt or yarṣyat), Ladino, Judeo-Italian, Judeo-Tajik, and Judeo-Tat. Yosef Ḥayyim of Baghdad notes a once-common false etymology of the word as a Hebrew acronym. Other names for the commemoration include naḥalah (נחלה) or azkarah (אזכרה) in Hebrew, meldado and anyos in Ladino, and sāl (سال) in Judeo-Persian.

== History ==
The tradition of commemorating a death anniversary in Judaism has ancient origins. During the Talmudic era, it was common to observe the date of a father's or teacher's death by fasting, or by abstaining from consuming meat and wine. The Gemara's discussion suggests that this was a voluntary practice in accordance with the directive to honour one's father "while alive and after his death." Rashi notes that it was customary to gather around the grave of a distinguished individual on the anniversary of his death.

The modern practice of observing Yahrzeit for parents likely originated among the Jewish communities of medieval Germany, later being adopted by Sephardic Jews.

== Customs ==
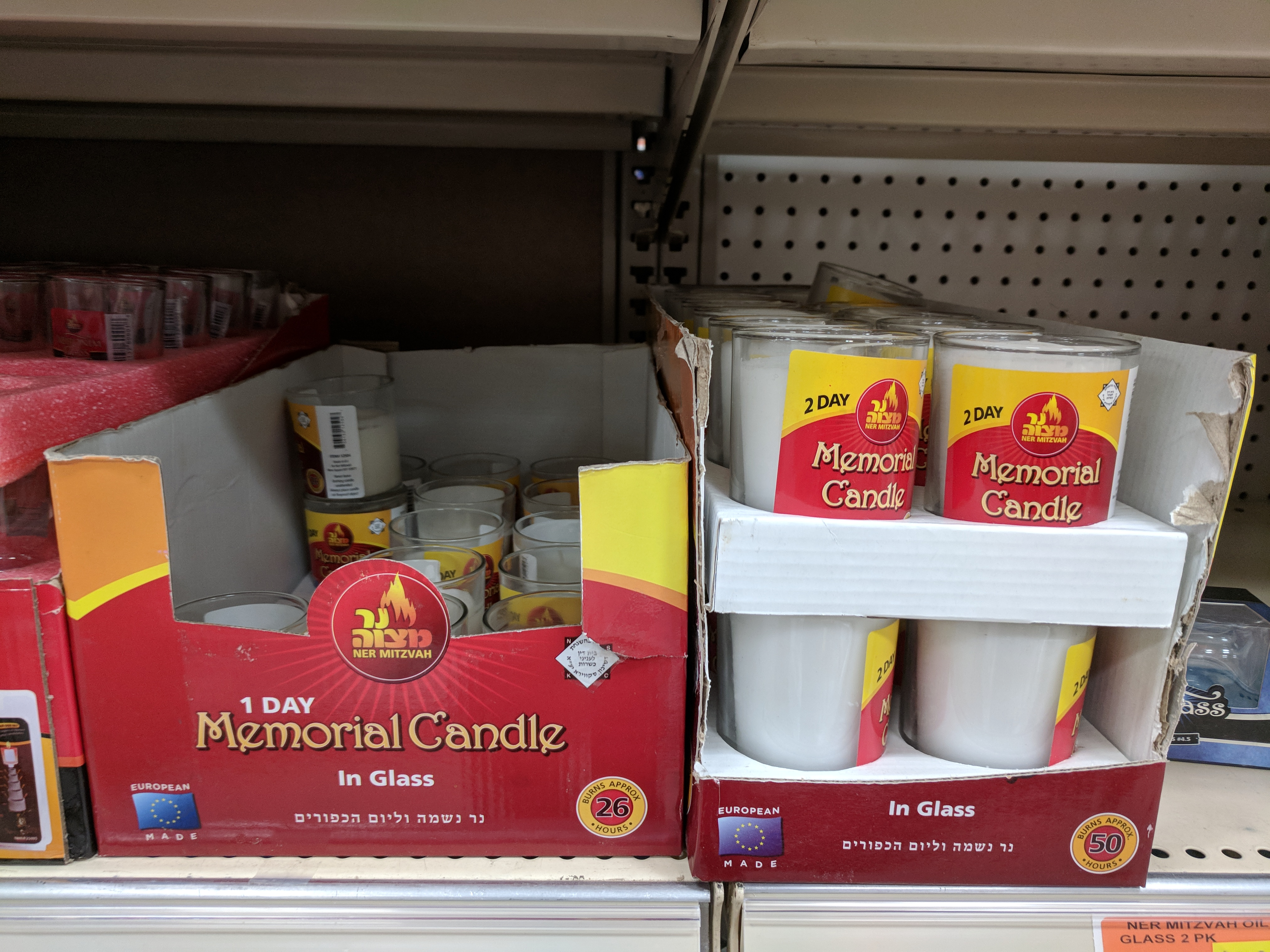
Yahrzeit candles for sale at a Jewish grocery store

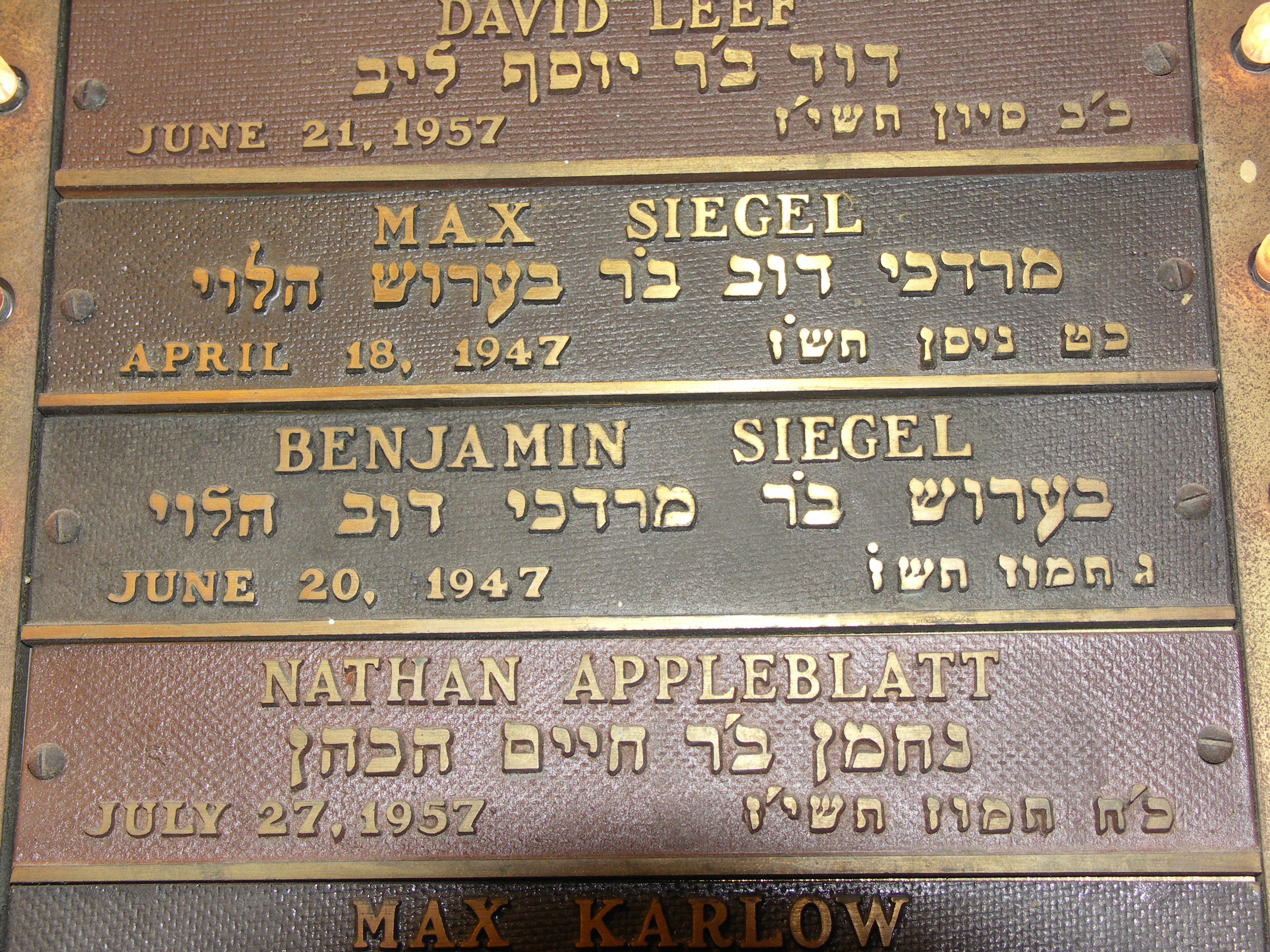
Memorial plaques on a synagogue Yahrzeit board

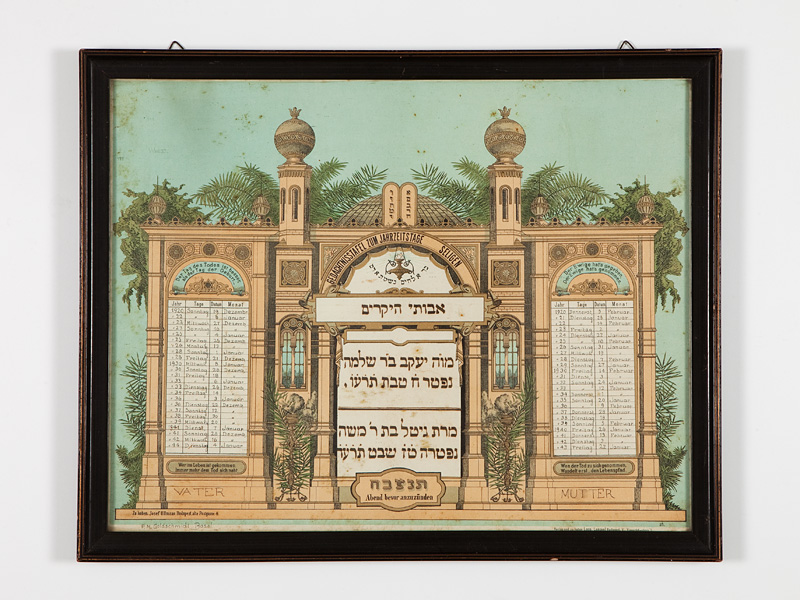
Early 20th-century Yahrzeit table, in the collection of the Jewish Museum of Switzerland

=== Date of observance ===
Yahrzeit is typically observed on the anniversary according to the Hebrew calendar of the date of death of an immediate family member or outstanding individual. Some authorities hold that when an individual was not buried within two days of their death, the first Yahrzeit is instead held on the anniversary of their burial. There are also exceptions when the date falls on Rosh Ḥodesh or in a leap year of the Hebrew calendar:

Date of passing	Situation on the day of Yahrtzeit	Commemorated on
First day of a two-day Rosh Ḥodesh, i.e., last (30th) day of the previous month	Rosh Ḥodesh only has one day	29th (last) day of the earlier month (not a Rosh Ḥodesh)
Second day of a two-day Rosh Ḥodesh, i.e. first day of the new month	Rosh Ḥodesh only has one day	First day of the month (Rosh Ḥodesh)
First day of a two-day Rosh Ḥodesh, i.e., last (30th) day of the previous month	Rosh Ḥodesh has two days	First day of the two-day Rosh Ḥodesh
Second day of a two-day Rosh Ḥodesh, i.e., first day of the new month	Rosh Ḥodesh has two days	Second day of the two-day Rosh Ḥodesh
Adar I (leap year)	Is a leap year	Adar I
Adar I (leap year)	Not a leap year	Adar
Adar (not a leap year)	Is a leap year	Opinions vary (either Adar I, Adar II, or both)
Adar (not a leap year)	Is not a leap year	Adar
Adar II (leap year)	Is a leap year	Adar II
Adar II (leap year)	Is not a leap year	Adar
Other days (incl. Shabbat or Yom Tov)	Any	On date of passing

=== Common practices ===
When commemorated by an immediate relative, the day is marked by two main practices: reciting the Mourner's Kaddish, and lighting the Yahrzeit candle, which is kept burning for twenty-four hours. Other customs including being called up to the public reading of the Torah or reciting the Haftara on the preceding Shabbat, and sponsoring a synagogue Kiddush in honour of the deceased. A lightbulb by the name of the deceased may be lit on the synagogue's Yahrzeit board. Historically, fasting was also a common practice.

According to some sources, the Yahrzeit candle holds Kabbalistic significance. Aaron Berechiah of Modena likens the burning wick in the candle to the soul in the body, citing the Proverb "man's soul is the candle of God." He notes furthermore that the numerical value of נר דלוק ('burning candle') is equivalent to that of השכינה ('the Shekhinah'). Other scholars posit that the candle-lighting tradition may have Christian origins.

Some communities, especially Sephardim in the Land of Israel, were initially opposed to reciting the Mourner's Kaddish after the first eleven months following a death, contending that it would cast a negative light on the departed. Isaac Luria offered an alternative perspective, explaining that "while the orphan's Kaddish within the eleven months helps the soul to pass from Gehinnom to Gan Eden, the Yahrzeit Kaddish elevates the soul every year to a higher sphere in paradise." Menasseh ben Israel also adopts this perspective.

Ḥasidic Jews traditionally celebrate the Yahrzeit of their respective rabbis with song, dance, and general rejoicing, resulting in a shift from the originally mournful nature of the celebration to an occasion of joyous festivity. The Mitnaggedim vehemently objected to this innovation.

== Notable Yahrzeits ==
The most widely-observed Yahrzeit is on the Seventh of Adar I, the anniversary of Moses' death; Lag ba-Omer, the Yahrzeit of Simeon ben Yoḥai, observed at his tomb in Meron since at least the 16th century; and the Fast of Gedalia, the date of Gedaliah ben Ahikam's assassination.

A Yahrzeit celebration in honour of Meïr Ba'al ha-Nes is held in Tiberias on the 15th of Iyyar. In Morocco, annual pilgrimages are made to the tombs of Isaac ben Walid and Haïm Pinto on the anniversaries of their deaths. Until the Second World War, the Yahrzeit of Moses Isserles was observed in Cracow on the 18th of Iyyar.

In the State of Israel, the Yahrzeits of national figures are observed as holidays, such as Ben-Gurion Day, Herzl Day, Jabotinsky Day, and Rabin Day.

== See also ==
- Bereavement in Judaism
