= Public holidays in Israel =

For exact dates in the Gregorian calendar see Jewish and Israeli holidays 2000–2050.

Public holidays in Israel are national holidays officially recognized by the Knesset, Israel's parliament. The State of Israel has adopted most traditional religious Jewish holidays as part of its national calendar, while also having established new modern holiday observances since its founding in 1948. Additionally, Christians, Muslims, and Druze have the right to Holiday leave on the holidays of their own religions. Of the religious and modern holidays below, some are bank holidays / national holidays requiring all schools, government institutions, financial sector, and most retailers in Jewish Israeli society to be closed, while other holidays are marked as days of note or memorial remembrances with no breaks in public or private sector activities.

As is the case with all religious Jewish holidays, most public holidays in Israel generally begin and end at sundown, and follow the Hebrew calendar. Because of this, most holidays in Israel fall on a different Gregorian calendar date each year, which syncs every 19 years with the Hebrew calendar.

Shabbat, the weekly Sabbath day of rest, in Israel begins every Friday evening just before sundown, ending Saturday evening just after sundown. Most of the Israeli workforce, including schools, banks, public transportation, government offices, and retailers within Jewish Israeli society are shut down during these approximately 25 hours, with some non-Jewish retailers and most non-kosher restaurants still open.

== Public holidays ==
Public holidays in Israel are calculated based on the Hebrew calendar which Jewish is majority of this country. The following are official holidays imposed by government authorities, except in cases of emergency or entities that require daily operational activities.

Date/Range of dates in the Hebrew calendar	English name	Hebrew name	Status
Every Friday evening before sundown to Saturday evening after sundown	Sabbath	שבת; Shabbat	Official holiday with all schools, government institutions, public transportation and most retailers shut down
Tishrei 1-2	New Year	ראש השנה; Rosh Hashanah	Official holiday (2 days)
Tishrei 10	Day of Atonement	יום כיפור; Yom Kippur	Official holiday, businesses close around noon on the holiday's eve. Absolutely all businesses nationwide are closed. Virtually no traffic on the streets with the exception of emergency vehicles. Exceptions in Arab areas. Non-emergency services that normally operate on holidays, e.g. airports, border crossings, broadcasting stations etc. suspend their work for about 28–30 hours.
Tishrei 15	Feast of Tabernacles	סוכות; Sukkot	Official holiday
Tishrei 22	Simchat Torah/Shmini Atzeret	שמחת תורה/שמיני עצרת; Simchat Torah/Shemini Atzeret	Official holiday
Nisan 15	Passover	פסח; Pesach	Official holiday
Nisan 21	Seventh day of Passover	שביעי של פסח; Shvi'i shel Pesach	Official holiday
Iyar 5	Independence Day	יום העצמאות; Yom Ha-Atzmaut	Official Holiday
Sivan 6	Shavuot	שבועות; Shavuot	Official holiday
Av 9	Tisha B'Av, fast	תשעה באב; Tisha B'Av	Official holiday

== Optional holidays or Observances ==
Jewish holidays are defined by the Hebrew calendar. Christian holidays are defined by the Gregorian calendar for Catholics and the Julian calendar for Orthodox. Druze holidays are also defined by the Gregorian calendar, with the sole exception of Eid al-Adha which is also celebrated by Muslims (and therefore defined by the Lunar Hijri calendar). Secular observances which are common to all religions are defined by the Hebrew calendar if they are of a uniquely national nature (such as Yom Ha-Atzmaut), and by the Gregorian calendar if they are of a global or international nature (such as Victory in Europe Day).

=== Jewish holidays ===
Date/Range of dates in the Hebrew calendar	English name	Hebrew name	Status
Tishrei 3	Fast of Gedaliah	צום גדליה; Fast of Gedalia	Business as usual
Tishrei 16-21	Feast of Tabernacles	חול המועד סוכות; Chol HaMoed	School holiday, collective paid leave in many businesses and government offices
Tishrei 22	Simchat Torah/Shmini Atzeret	שמחת תורה/שמיני עצרת; Simchat Torah/Shemini Atzeret	Official holiday
Tishrei 24	Iron Sword War Memorial Day	יום הזיכרון לחללי מלחמת חרבות ברזל	Memorial day
Heshvan 12	Rabin Day	יום רבין; Rabin Day	National remembrance day, business as usual
Heshvan 29	Sigd	סיגד; Sigd	Festival of the Ethiopian Jews, optional paid leave, business as usual
Kislev 6	Ben-Gurion Day	יום בן-גוריון; Ben-Gurion Day	Day marked by the Knesset
Kislev 25-Tevet 2/3	Hanukkah	חנוכה; Hanukkah	School holiday for the duration of the 8 day festival, business as usual
Tevet 10	Tenth of Tevet	צום עשרה בטבת; Tsom Asarah b-Tevet	Business as usual
Shvat 15	Tu Bishvat (Arborial New Year)	ט"ו בשבט; Tu Bishvat	Business as usual
Adar 13 (in Adar II on leap years)	Fast of Esther	תענית אסתר; Ta`anit Ester	School holiday, business as usual
Adar 14 (in Adar II on leap years)	Purim	פורים; Purim	School holiday, optional paid leave; not observed in localities where Shusan Purim is observed
Adar 15 (in Adar II on leap years)	Purim	שושן פורים; Shushan Purim	School holiday, optional paid leave; observed only in certain cities that were walled in ancient times, such as Jerusalem, Tzfat, Tiberias, Hebron, & Shiloh
Nisan 10	Aliyah Day	יום העלייה; Yom HaAliyah	National remembrance day, business as usual
Nisan 16-20	Passover (intermediate days)	חול המועד פסח; Chol HaMoed Pesach	School holiday, collective paid leave in many businesses and government offices
Nisan 22	Mimouna	מימונה; Mimouna	Unpaid leave upon request
Nisan 27	Holocaust Remembrance Day	יום הזיכרון לשואה ולגבורה; Yom HaZikaron LaShoah VeLaGevurah	National remembrance day, business as usual except places of public entertainment
Iyar 4	Fallen Soldiers and Victims of Terrorism Remembrance Day	יום הזיכרון לחללי מערכות ישראל ונפגעי פעולות האיבה; Yom HaZikaron LeChalalei Ma'arachot Israel VeNifga'ei Peulot HaEyva	National remembrance day, business as usual except places of public entertainment
Iyar 10	Herzl Day	יום הרצל; Yom Herzl	Day marked by the Knesset
Iyar 18	Lag BaOmer	ל"ג בעומר; Lag Ba'omer	School holiday
Iyar 28	Jerusalem Day	יום ירושלים; Yom Yerushalayim	Optional paid leave
Tammuz 17	Seventeenth of Tammuz, fast	שבעה עשר בתמוז; Tsom Shiva` Asar b-Tammuz	Business as usual
Tammuz 20	Herzl's Death Day	יום פטירת הרצל; Yom Ptirat Herzl	Optional paid leave
Tammuz 29	Jabotinsky Day	יום ז'בוטינסקי; Yom Jabotinsky	Day marked by the Knesset
Av 15	Tu B'Av (Fifteenth of Av)	ט"ו באב; Tu B'Av	Business as usual

=== Christian, Druze and Secular holidays ===
Date/Range of dates in Gregorian calendar	English name	Hebrew name	Status
Jan 1	Civic New Year's Day	ראש השנה האזרחית; Rosh Hashana HaEzrachit	Optional paid leave
Jan 1 (Catholic); Jan 14 (Orthodox)	Christian New Year's Day	ראש השנה הנוצרית; Rosh Hashana HaNotzrit	Recognized Christian holiday
Jan 6 (Catholic); Jan 19 (Orthodox)	Epiphany	חג ההתגלות; Chag HaHitgalut	Recognized Christian holiday
Jan 25	Ziyarat al-Nabi Al-Khadir	חג הנביא אל-ח'דר; Chag HaNavi Al-Khadir	Recognized Druze Holiday
Mar 8	International Women's Day	יום האישה הבין־לאומי; Yom HaIsha HaBeinleumi	Optional paid leave
Between Mar 20 & Apr 23 (Catholic); Between Apr 2 & May 6 (Orthodox)	Friday before Easter (Good Friday)	יום ששי לפני פסחא; Yom Shishi Lifnei Pascha	Recognized Christian holiday
Between Mar 23 & Apr 26 (Catholic); Between Apr 5 & May 9 (Orthodox)	Easter Monday	יום שני לפסחא; Yom Sheni LaPascha	Recognized Christian holiday
Apr 25-28	Ziyara	חג הנביא שועייב; Chag HaNavi Shu'ayb	Recognized Druze Holiday (3 days)
May 1	May 1	אחד במאי; Echad BeMay	Optional paid leave
May 9	Victory Day over Nazi Germany (Victory in Europe Day)	יום הניצחון על גרמניה הנאצית; Yom HaNitzachon al Germania HaNatzit	Day marked by the Knesset
Between Apr 30 & Jun 3 (Catholic); Between May 13 & Jun 16 (Orthodox)	Ascension of Jesus	עליית ישו השמיימה; Aliyat Yeshu Hashamaima	Recognized Christian holiday
Between May 11 & Jun 14 (Catholic); Between May 24 & Jun 27 (Orthodox)	Pentecost Monday	יום שני לשבועות; Yom Sheni LeShavuot	Recognized Christian holiday
Dec 25-26 (for Catholics); Jan 7-8 (for Orthodox)	Christmas	חג המולד; Chag Hamolad	Recognized Christian holiday (2 days)

=== Muslim holidays ===
Date/Range of dates in Lunar Hijri calendar	English name	Hebrew name	Arabic name	Status
Muharram 1	Islamic New Year	ראש השנה המוסלמית; Rosh HaShanah HaMuslemit	رأس السنة الهجرية	Recognized Islamic holiday
Rabi' al-awwal 12	Mawlid	חג הולדת הנביא מוחמד; Chag Huledet HaNavi Muhammad	مولد النبي	Recognized Islamic holiday
Shawwal 1-3	Eid al-Fitr	עיד אל פיטר (חג סיום צום הרמדאן); Eid al-Fitr (Chag Siyum Tzom HaRamadan)	عيد الفطر	Recognized Islamic holiday (3 days)
Dhu al-Hijjah 10-13	Eid al-Adha	עיד אל אדחא (חג הקורבן); Eid al-Adha (Chag HaKorban)	عيد الأضحى	Recognized Islamic and Druze holiday (4 days)

== See also ==
- Jewish holidays
