= Three Pilgrimage Festivals =

Three major festivals in Judaism

The Three Pilgrimage Festivals or Three Pilgrim Festivals, also known by their Hebrew name Shalosh Regalim (Hebrew: שלוש רגלים, romanized: šālōš rəgālīm, or חַגִּים, ḥaggīm), are three major festivals in Judaism — Passover, Shavuot, and Sukkot — when all Israelites who were able were expected to make a pilgrimage to the Temple in Jerusalem as commanded by the Torah. In Jerusalem, they would participate in festivities and ritual worship at the Temple in Jerusalem.

All three holidays coincide with important harvest times in the Land of Israel: Passover with the barley harvest, Shavuot with the harvesting of the wheat, and the eighth day of Sukkot marks the conclusion of the fruit harvest.

The command to perform pilgrimage on these dates is known as Aliya la'regel (Hebrew: עלייה לרגל). The primary mitzvah is to "be seen" at the Temple – known as the mitzvah of re'iyah (ראייה) – rather than merely visiting Jerusalem.

== Etymology ==
The three pilgrimage festivals are collectively known as the "Shalosh Regalim" (literally "three occasions"), based on Exodus 23:14. The latter word (regel in the singular) has the dual meaning of "foot" and "time/occasion". Because walking is done by putting one foot in front of the other in repeated steps, the word regel (foot) also used metaphorically to refer to any event which repeated itself periodically.

The commandment to make the pilgrimage became known as "Aliya la'regel", literally "going up for the occasion". This phrase is sometimes mistranslated as "going up on foot", an easy mistake to make because the pilgrimage was typically done on foot.

== Practices ==
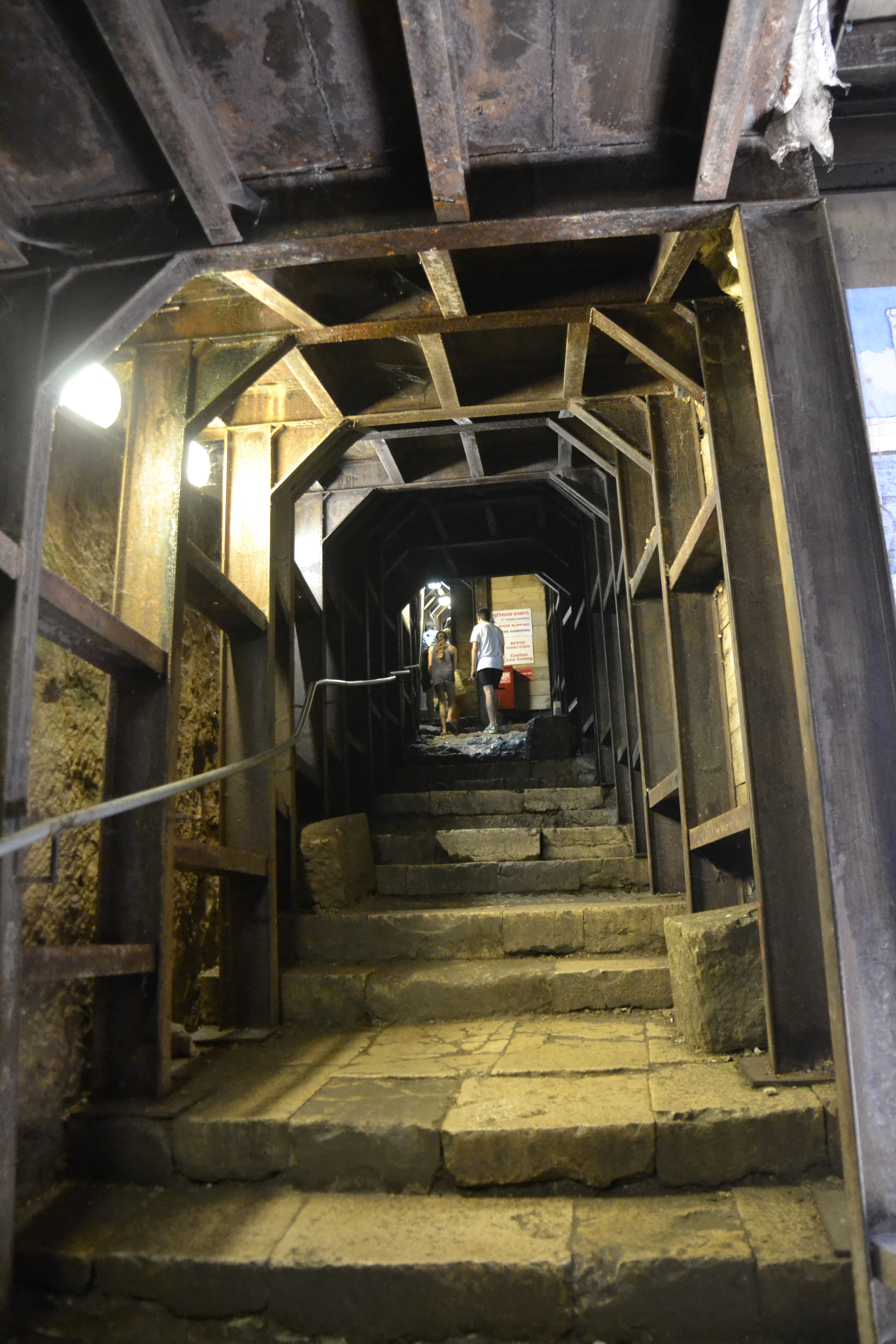
The Pilgrimage Road used by visitors to the Temple.

During the Second Temple period, the pilgrimage festivals drew massive crowds to Jerusalem arriving from in and beyond the land of Israel. The first-century historian Philo of Alexandria described these large pilgrimages, writing: "Countless multitudes from countless cities come, some over land, others by sea, from east and west and north and south at every feast." Some pilgrims from abroad would visit only once in their lifetimes, however, due to the greater distances involved. Flavius Josephus further described the scale of the Passover gathering, writing that "an innumerable multitude came thither out of the country, nay, from beyond its limits also, in order to worship God". Archaeological evidence, including a monumental pilgrimage road and a mikveh found near the Temple Mount, corroborates these accounts of large-scale festival travel. Similarly, the pilgrimage's scale is suggested by the finding at least 37% of the goat and sheep consumed in Jerusalem during the late Second Temple era were imported from desert regions.

The Mishnah depicts Aliya la'regel as a grand celebration, with pilgrims adorned in festive attire, singing songs, and playing musical instruments. Pirkei Avot describes two alleged miracles which enabled the pilgrimage rituals to proceed despite the crowding: "the people stood pressed together, yet bowed down and had room enough", and "no man said to his fellow: the place is too congested for me to lodge overnight in Jerusalem".

During the Second Temple period, Jerusalem saw pilgrims from across the Jewish diaspora, including Rome, Alexandria in Egypt, Iberia, and Babylon, although historical estimates of millions of participants are considered exaggerated. Ritual adaptations were made to allow flexibility for pilgrims' needs, such as "Pasei Biraot" which was practiced on Shabbat.

According to Halakha, the mitzvah during the pilgrimage festivals is to come to the Temple Mount and be "seen before God" (Exodus 23:17). This involves bringing three different korbans: Olat Re’iyah, Shalmei Chagigah and Shalmei Simcha.

Only adult men are obligated to fulfill these commandments, although minors who are capable of ascending to the Temple are also expected to do so. Women are not obligated to come to the Temple; however, they are required to partake in the eating of sacrificed meat during the festival days.

=== Post-destruction ===
After the destruction of the Second Temple, the actual pilgrimages are no longer obligatory upon Jews, and no longer take place on a national scale. In Yavneh, the Sanhedrin assembled on the Three Pilgrimage Festivals, and delegations of diaspora Jews traveled to the city to have their questions answered. Jews also traveled to Jerusalem, including on Sukkot.

Following the establishment of Israel, symbolic pilgrimages to Mount Zion were led by Rabbi Yedidia Frankel. Among the Beta Israel community, the holiday of Sigd also involves a pilgrimage, traditionally to a mountain with holy books, now celebrated in Jerusalem. Despite the absence of a formal obligation, visiting the Temple Mount is still seen as fulfilling a mitzvah due to its enduring sacredness.

During synagogue services, the related passages describing the holiday being observed are read aloud from a Torah scroll on the bimah (platform) used at the center of the synagogue services. During the Jewish holidays in the state of Israel, many observant Jews living in or near Jerusalem make an effort to attend prayer services at the Western Wall, emulating the ancient pilgrimages in some small fashion.

Samaritans make pilgrimages to Mount Gerizim three times a year to this day.

== Sources in the Hebrew Bible ==
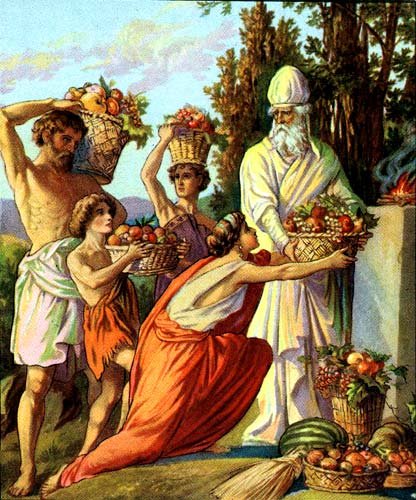
Offering of the first fruits, illustration from a Bible card

You shall observe the Feast of Unleavened Bread—eating unleavened bread for seven days, as I have commanded you—at the set time of the month of Abib, for in the month of Abib you went forth from Egypt. Every first issue of the womb is Mine, from all your livestock that drop a male as firstling, whether cattle or sheep. But the firstling of an ass you shall redeem with a sheep; if you do not redeem it, you must break its neck. And you must redeem every male first-born among your children. None shall appear before Me empty-handed. Six days you shall work, but on the seventh day you shall cease from labor; you shall cease from labor even at plowing time and harvest time. You shall observe the Feast of Weeks, of the first fruits of the wheat harvest; and the Feast of Ingathering at the turn of the year. Three times a year all your males shall appear before the Sovereign יהוה, the God of Israel.

— Exodus 34:18–19

- Book of Deuteronomy:

1 Observe the month of Abib and offer a passover sacrifice to your God יהוה, for it was in the month of Abib, at night, that your God יהוה freed you from Egypt.

9 You shall count off seven weeks; start to count the seven weeks when the sickle is first put to the standing grain. 10 Then you shall observe the Feast of Weeks for your God יהוה, offering your freewill contribution according as your God יהוה has blessed you. 13 After the ingathering from your threshing floor and your vat, you shall hold the Feast of Booths for seven days. 16 Three times a year—on the Feast of Unleavened Bread, on the Feast of Weeks, and on the Feast of Booths—all your males shall appear before your God יהוה in the place that [God] will choose. They shall not appear before יהוה empty-handed,

17 but each with his own gift, according to the blessing that your God יהוה has bestowed upon you.

— Deuteronomy 16:1, 9–10, 13, 16–17

=== Other biblical references ===
In his vision of a restored Jerusalem, the prophet Isaiah refers to Zion as "the city of our appointed feasts". Zechariah foretells a messianic era when all nations will come to Jerusalem for the feast of Sukkot. The Song of Ascents or pilgrim psalms (Psalms 120–134) are associated with the pilgrims' journey to Jerusalem.

== See also ==
- Aliyah, immigration of Jews to the Land of Israel
- Jewish holidays
