= National Memorial Ceremony of October 7 Families =

Israeli national memorial ceremony

National Memorial Ceremony of October 7 Families טקס הזיכרון הלאומי של משפחות 7 באוקטובר
- Genre: memorial ceremony
- Date: October 7
- Frequency: Annual
- Venue: Yarkon Park
- Location: Tel Aviv
- Country: Israel
- Years active: 2024–present
- Inaugurated: October 7, 2024
- Organizer: Kumu

The National Memorial Ceremony of October 7 Families (Hebrew: טקס הזיכרון הלאומי של משפחות 7 באוקטובר) is an independent, civil Israeli national memorial ceremony held annually on October 7 to mark the anniversary of the 2023 October 7 attacks. It was established in 2024 by families of victims and hostages as an alternative to the official state Remembrance Day for the Fallen of the Swords of Iron War, which is marked on a different date according to the Hebrew calendar.

The event takes place in Yarkon Park, Tel Aviv, and is organized by Kumu, a movement founded by the families of Israeli hostages and their relatives.

== Background ==
In August 2024, the Israeli government decided to hold a state ceremony commemorating an anniversary for the Hamas-led attack on Israel. The event was organized under the authority of Transport Minister Miri Regev. However, families of the victims - those kidnapped, murdered, or displaced - refused to participate in the government's event, citing the government's failure to take responsibility for its handling of the war. Instead, they announced plans to hold a separate ceremony to commemorate the massacre. In the same month, an alternative event was funded through crowdfunding, and was planned to held at a location that could accommodate large crowds safely.

== 2024 ceremony ==
Originally, the 2024 ceremony was planned to accommodate an audience of 40,000 people, but the scale was reduced due to wartime security concerns and new instructions from the Home Front Command that limited attendance to 2,000. In its final format, the event was primarily attended by the families of those kidnapped and killed in the Hamas-led attack on Israel. Despite the limited in-person attendance, the ceremony was broadcast across hundreds of places throughout Israel and aired on both national and international television networks.
