= Remembrance Day for the Fallen of the Swords of Iron War =

Israeli remembrance day

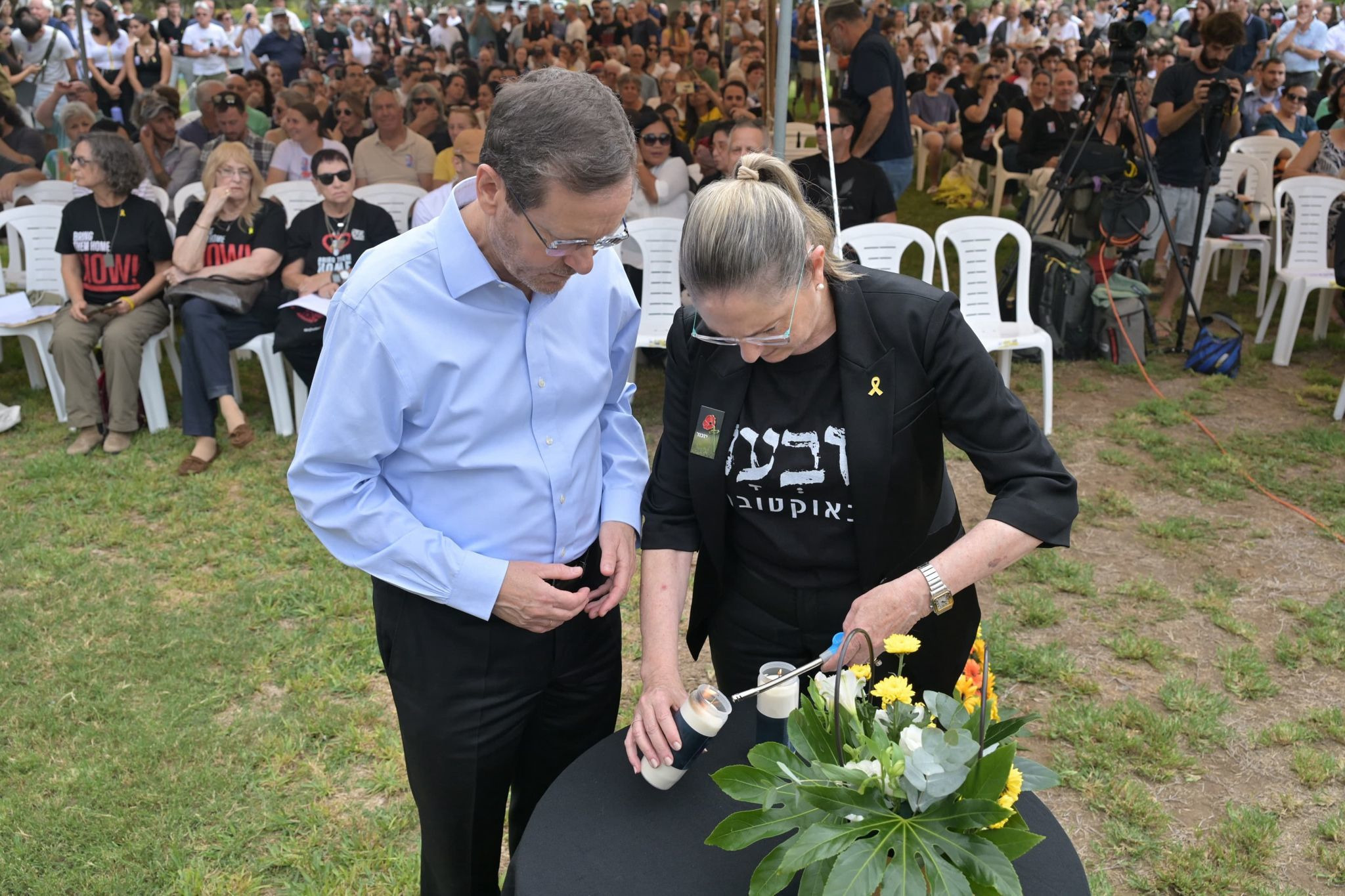
- Isaac Herzog, President of Israel, lights a memorial candle at Kibbutz Nirim (2024)
- Official name: יום הזיכרון לחללי מלחמת חרבות ברזל
- Observed by: Israel
- Type: National memorial day
- Significance: commemorates the victims of the October 7 attacks and IDF soldiers who fell during the Gaza war
- Date: 24 Tishrei (Hebrew calendar)
- Frequency: Annual
- First time: 2024

Remembrance Day for the Fallen of the Swords of Iron War (Hebrew: יום הזיכרון לחללי מלחמת חרבות ברזל) is a national memorial day commemorating the fallen victims of the October 7 attacks and the soldiers of the Israel Defense Forces who fell during the ensuing Gaza war. It is held on the 24th of Tishrei, two days after the Hebrew calendar date of the attacks which fell on Simchat Torah (22nd of Tishrei), in order to avoid a conflict with the major Jewish holiday.

A separate independent National Memorial Ceremony of October 7 Families is held on the calendar anniversary of October 7, established by grassroots organizers and victims' families citing government failures and lack of accountability.

== Background ==
On the morning of October 7, 2023, the Shabbat day of Simchat Torah, the 22nd of Tishrei 5784, the militant Palestinian organizations Hamas and Palestinian Islamic Jihad launched a surprise attack on Israel. Under the cover of firing thousands of rockets, around 3,500 militants infiltrated from the Gaza Strip into dozens of Israeli towns and military facilities in the Gaza periphery area, engaging in firefights with limited security forces. The militants carried out massacres and murdering 1,150 people, including 779 civilians, and kidnapping around 253 people, including women, elderly and infants, to the Gaza Strip. In the initial hours, they were confronted by reserve forces, Israel Police officers, Border Police fighters and IDF soldiers who were outnumbered. In the battles, around 1,550 militants were killed on Israeli soil, and on the Israeli side, 55 police officers, 10 Shin Bet security personnel and 301 soldiers were killed.

Following the high number of casualties in the surprise attack and the ensuing war in Gaza, the Israeli government declared the establishment of a national Memorial Day on the 24th of Tishrei, due to the 22nd being Simchat Torah and the 23rd being isru chag of Sukkot.

== History ==
In the wake of the surprise attack and the ensuing war, five legislative proposals for a national Memorial Day were submitted to the Knesset plenum. The proposals were made by MKs Eti Atia, Merav Ben-Ari, Eli Dellal, Naama Lazimi and Ohad Tal. Most proposals sought to establish the 23rd or 24th of Tishrei, one or two days after the Hebrew date of the attack, as the memorial day.

The proposals include various commemoration measures such as an official state ceremony, two minutes of silence, lowering the state flag to half-mast at state institutions and the IDF, a parliamentary session in the Knesset plenum, instructions for marking the day at state institutions and educational institutions, adjusting broadcast content on networks accordingly, and closing restaurants and entertainment venues.

On March 17, 2024, the Israeli government unanimously approved that every year on the 24th of Tishrei, a national Memorial Day will be observed to commemorate the October 7 massacre and the Iron Sword War, and that in the first year, a one-time ceremony will also take place on October 7. The rationale stated: "October 7 is etched in the Israeli public consciousness as the day of the terrible massacre. Precisely to mark the first anniversary of the largest terror attack in our history, in response to public sentiment in Israel, there is a need to commemorate the event on a one-time basis on its Gregorian date, which is engraved in the consciousness of the people of Israel and the world. The phrase 'October 7' is multilayered and connected to the Jewish concept of 'shiva', indicative of the mourning period concluding the first year after the attack began."

The Memorial Day will be marked annually on the 24th of Tishrei with two official ceremonies: at 11:00 AM a ceremony commemorating the fallen soldiers, and at 1:00 PM a ceremony commemorating the murdered civilian victims of hostilities.

== Date ==
Due to the first anniversary falling on Shabbat, the 24th of Tishrei, the ceremonies will take place on Sunday, the 25th of Tishrei, and likewise in any year when the 24th falls on Shabbat.
