= Rabin Day =

Israeli national holiday to commemorate Israeli Prime Minister Yitzhak Rabin

Yitzhak Rabin Memorial Day יום הזיכרון ליצחק רבין
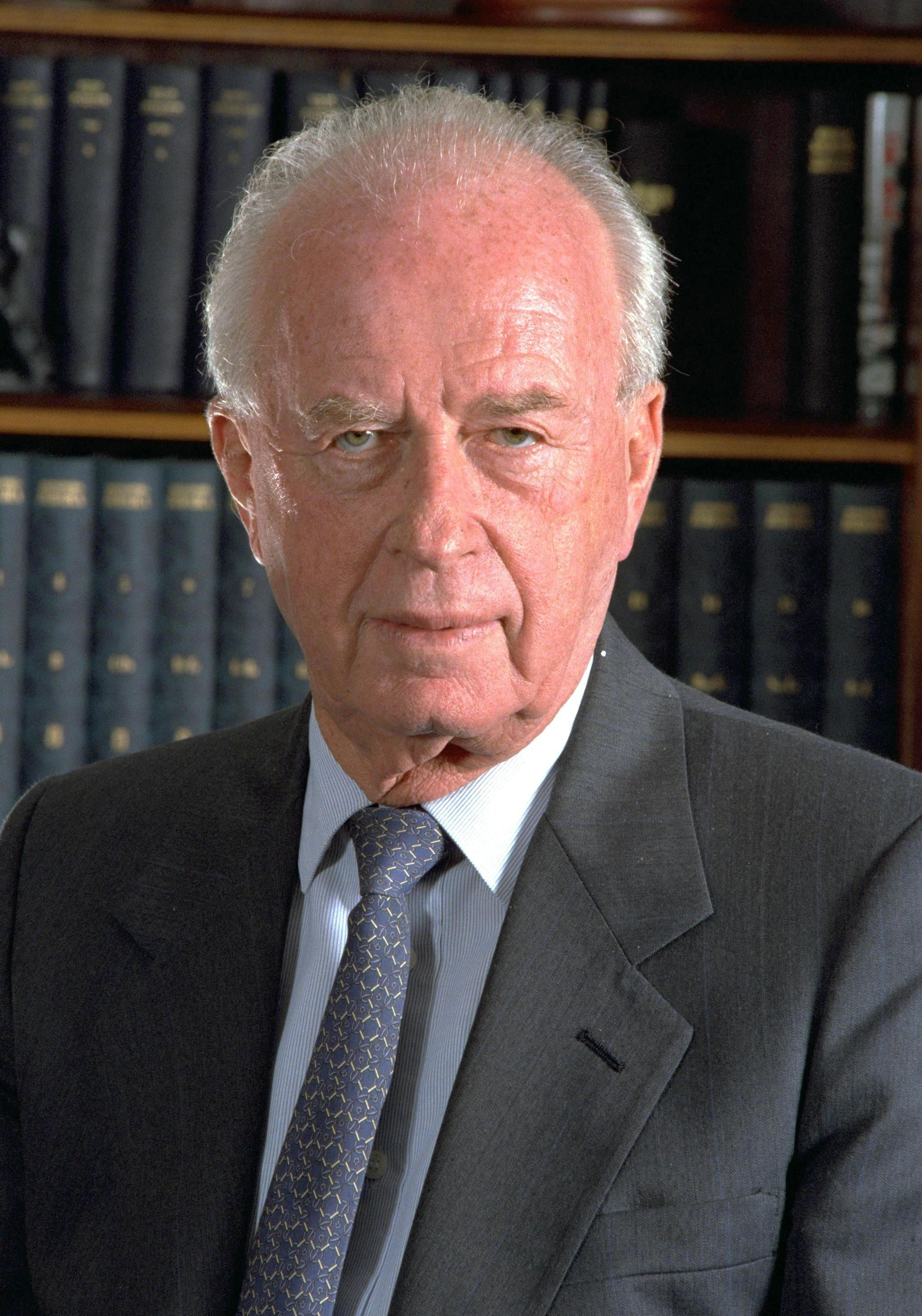
- Yitzhak Rabin
- Official name: Yitzhak Rabin Memorial Day Hebrew: יום הזיכרון ליצחק רבין
- Observed by: State of Israel
- Significance: Commemorating Israeli Prime Minister, Yitzhak Rabin, and his assassination.
- Begins: Cheshvan 12 (Hebrew calendar)
- Date: 12 Cheshvan
- Frequency: Annual

Yitzhak Rabin Memorial Day (Hebrew: יום הזיכרון ליצחק רבין) is an Israeli day of remembrance observed annually on the twelfth of the Hebrew month of Cheshvan, to commemorate the life of Zionist leader and Israeli Prime Minister and Defense Minister, Yitzhak Rabin, and his assassination.

== History ==
Yitzhak Rabin Memorial Day was created by the Israeli Knesset as part of the Yitzhak Rabin Memorial Law, passed in 1997, two years after his assassination. According to the law, Rabin Memorial Day shall be held annually on the twelfth day of Cheshvan, the day of Yitzhak Rabin's assassination, according to the Hebrew calendar (November 4, 1995, according to Gregorian calendar).

== Observance ==
This national day of remembrance is marked by all state institutions, on Israel Defense Forces army bases and in schools. The national flag is lowered to half mast, and a memorial service is held at his grave on Mount Herzl.

By law, schools shall observe this day by commemorating Yitzhak Rabin's work and by activities highlighting the importance of democracy in Israel and the danger that violence poses to society and country.

If the date falls either on Friday or Saturday, the memorial day will be held on the preceding Thursday.

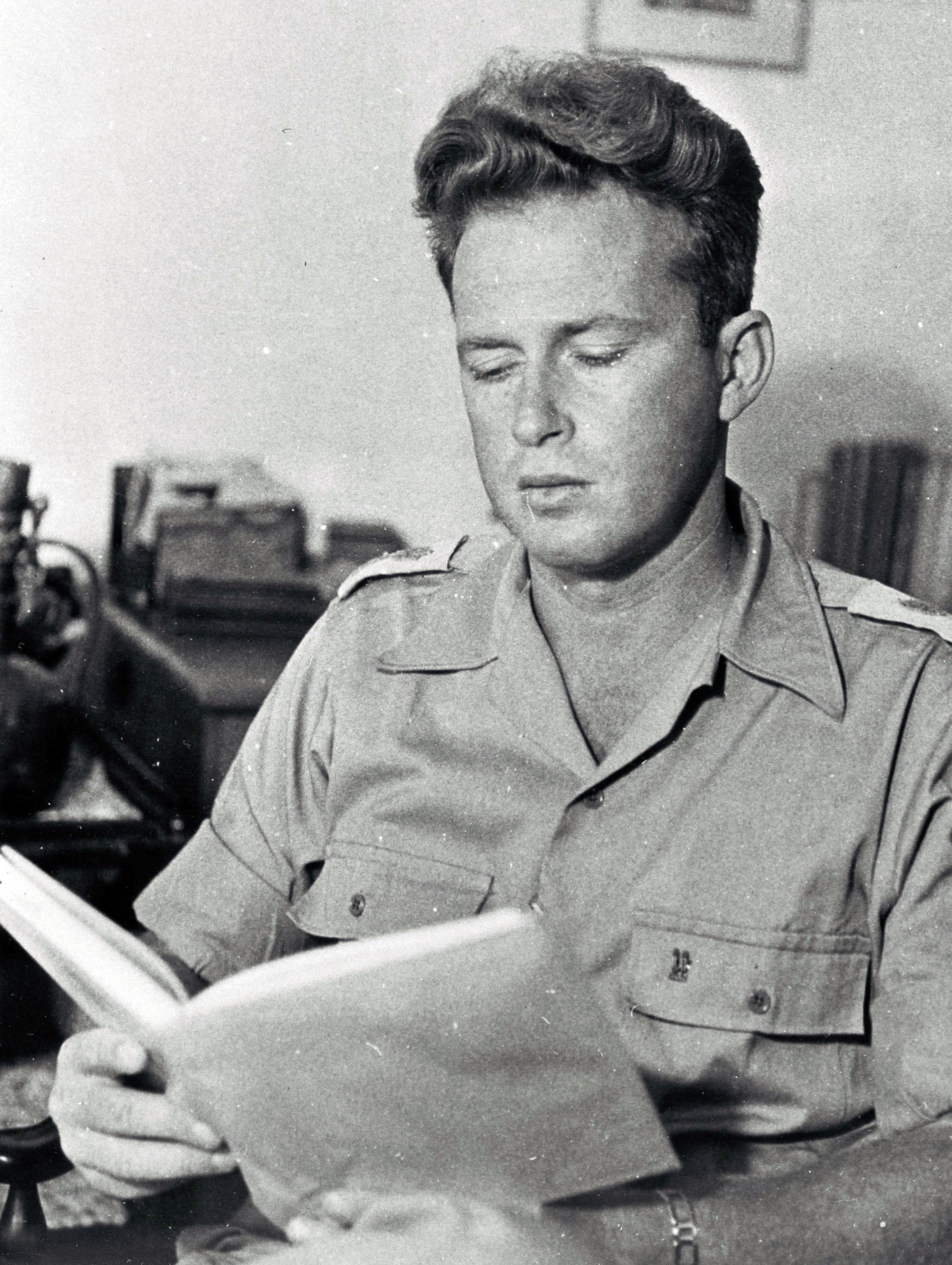
Yitzhak Rabin as Sgan Aluf

== See also ==
- Public holidays in Israel
- Culture of Israel
- Jewish holidays
