= Yom HaZikaron =

Israeli memorial day

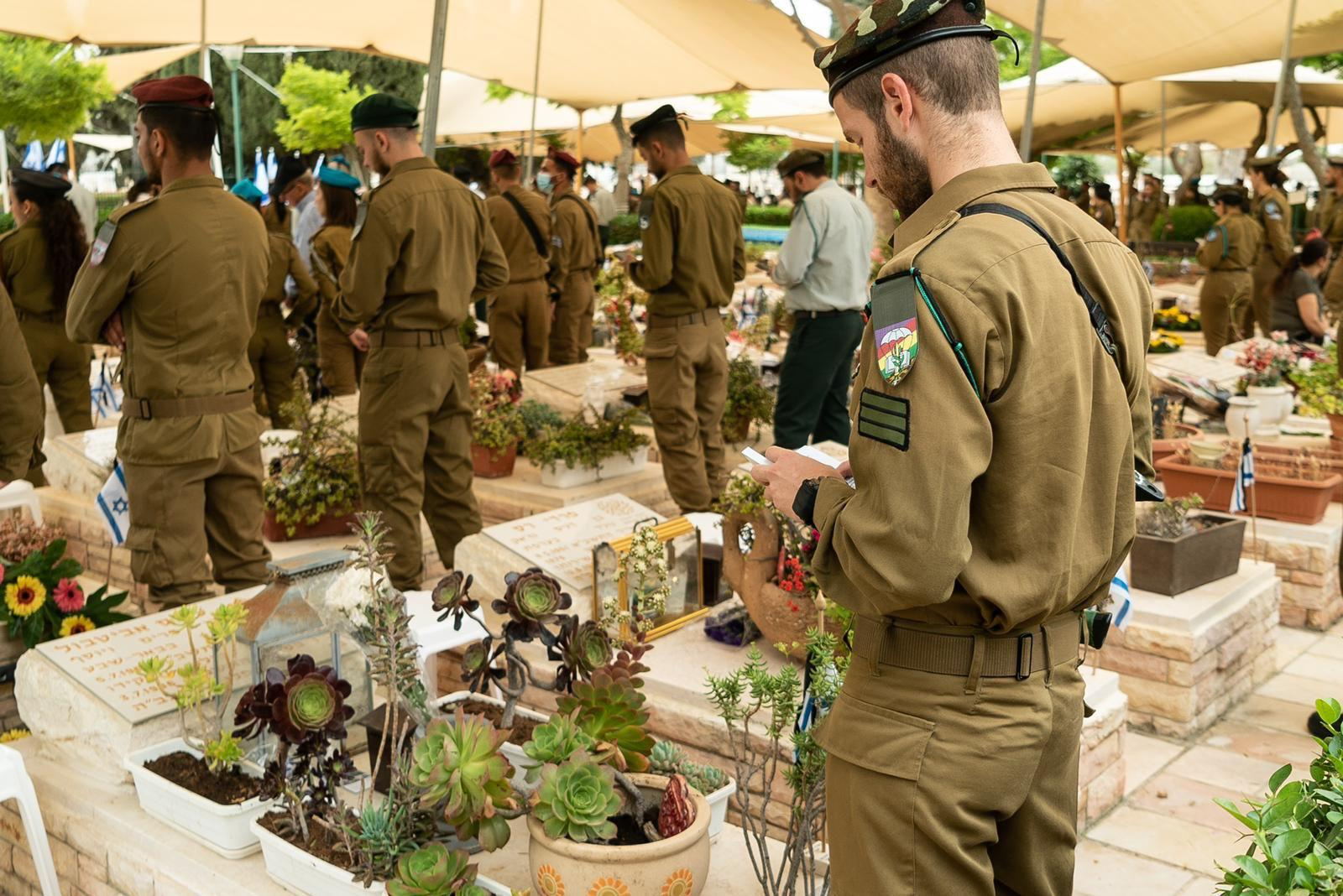
- IDF soldiers participate in an official Yom HaZikaron ceremony for the fallen soldiers and the victims of terror attacks.
- Observed by: Israelis
- Date: 4 Iyar (Hebrew calendar) (Note: Because of problems of Sabbath desecration and the need for it to precede the Independence Day, in years when the date falls on a Thursday or Friday, it is preponed to Wednesday, and in years when the date falls on Sunday, it is postponed to Monday (the 4th of Iyar cannot come on Saturday).)
- 2025 date: Sunset, 29 April – nightfall, 30 April
- 2026 date: Sunset, 20 April – nightfall, 21 April
- 2027 date: Sunset, 10 May – nightfall, 11 May
- 2028 date: Sunset, 30 April – nightfall, 1 May
- Related to: Independence Day

Yom HaZikaron (Hebrew: יוֹם הַזִּכָּרוֹן, lit. 'Remembrance day'), in full Yom HaZikaron LeHalelei Ma'arkhot Yisrael ul'Nifge'ei Pe'ulot HaEivah (Hebrew: יוֹם הזִּכָּרוֹן לְחַלְלֵי מַעַרְכוֹת יִשְׂרָאֵל וּלְנִפְגְעֵי פְּעֻלּוֹת הָאֵיבָה, lit. 'Remembrance day for the fallen soldiers of the wars of Israel and victims of actions of terrorism'), is Israel's official day of remembrance for fallen soldiers and terrorism victims, enacted into Israeli law in 1963. While Yom HaZikaron has been traditionally dedicated to fallen soldiers, commemoration has also been extended to civilian victims of terrorism.

== History ==
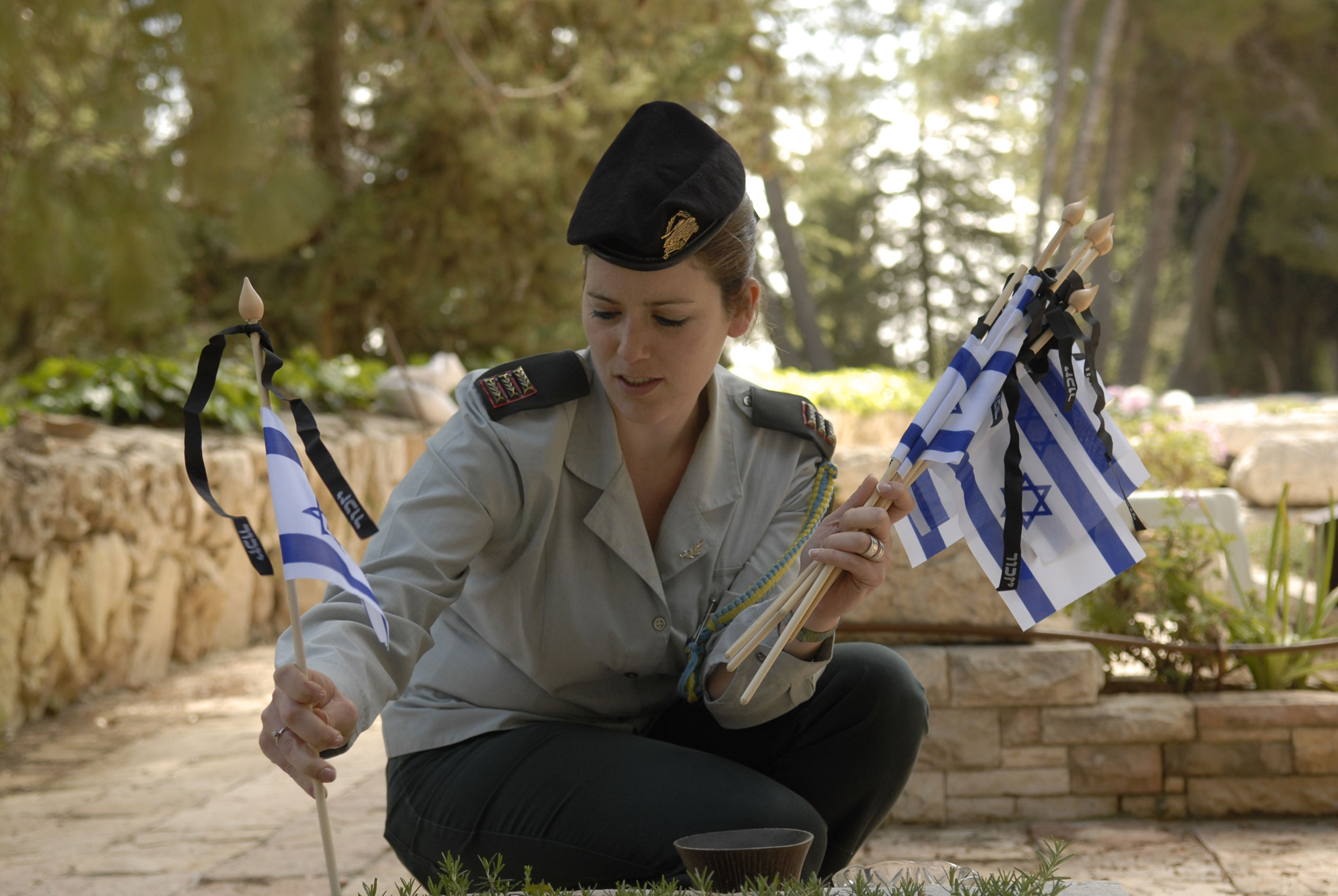
An IDF officer places new flags, each with a black ribbon, on the graves of IDF soldiers for Yom HaZikaron.

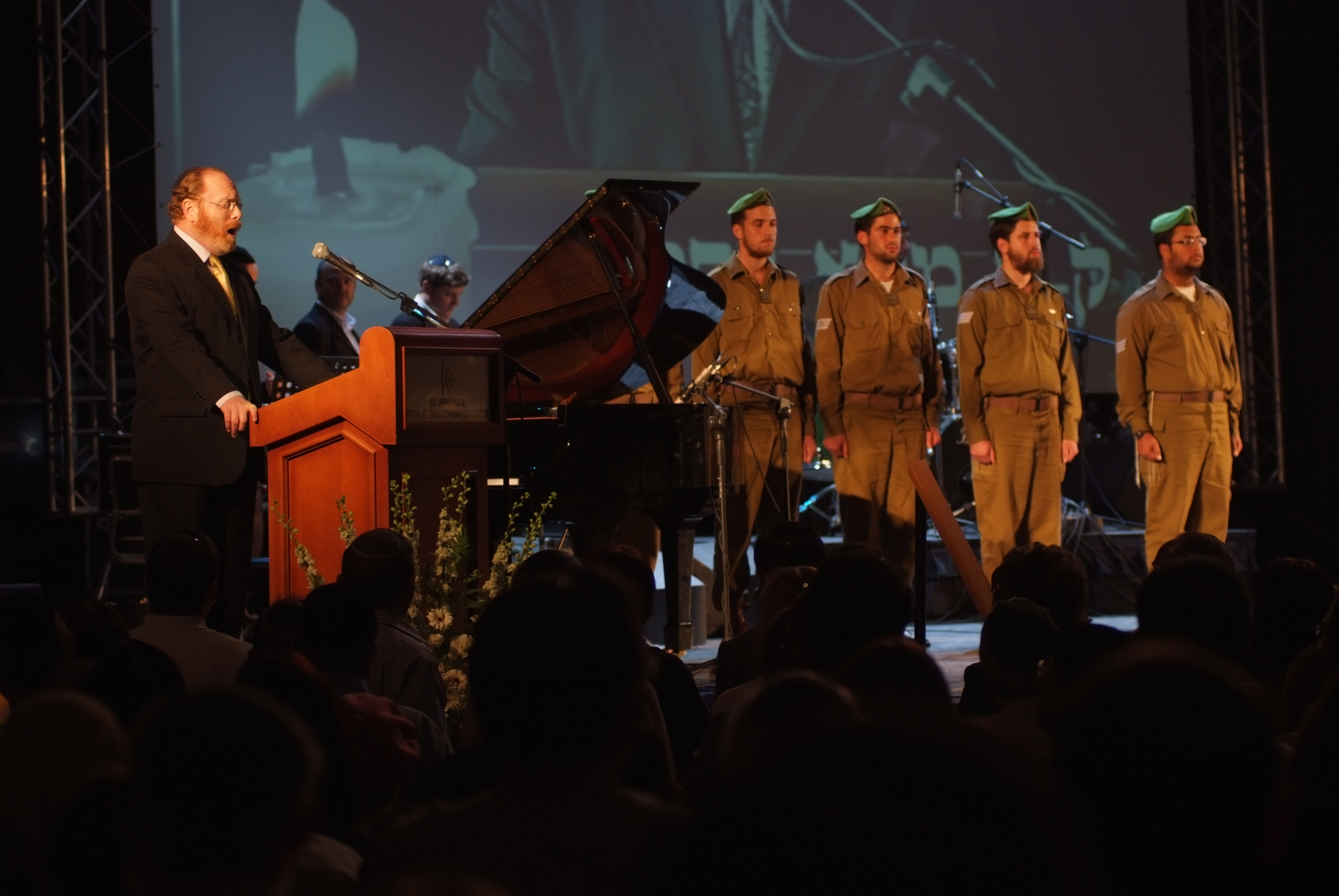
IDF soldiers at a Yom HaZikaron ceremony in 2007

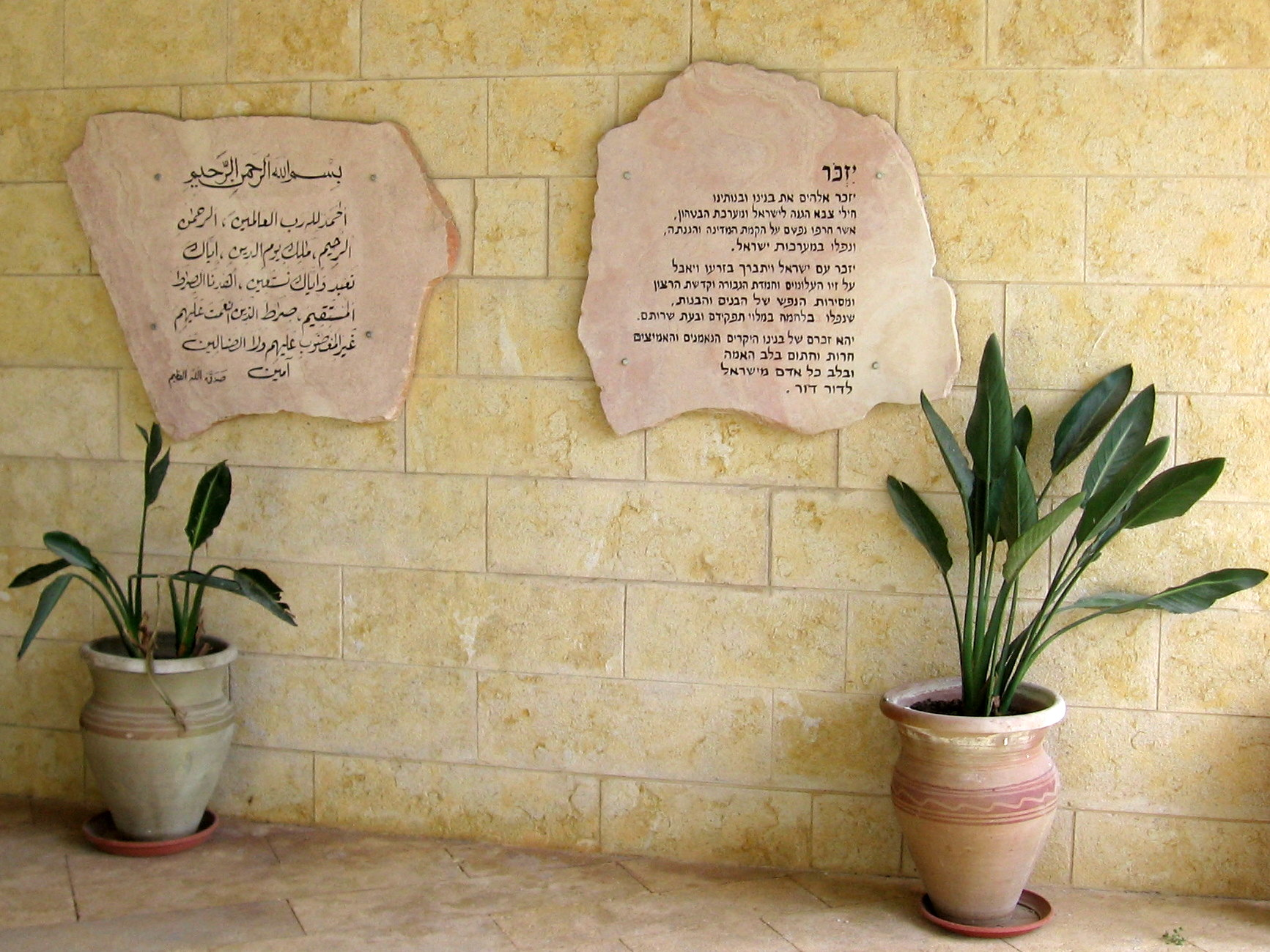
Bedouin Soldiers Memorial

In 1949 and 1950, the first two years after the declaration of the State, memorial services for soldiers who fell in the War of Independence were held on Independence Day. Services at military cemeteries were coordinated between the IDF and the Ministry of Defense. A concern arose, expressed by families of fallen soldiers, to establish a separate memorial day observance distinct from the festive celebrations of national independence. In response, and in light of public debate on the issue, Prime Minister David Ben-Gurion – also serving as Minister of Defense – established in January 1951 the "Public Council for Soldiers' Commemoration". This council recommended establishing the 4th of Iyyar, the day preceding Independence Day, as the "General Memorial Day for the Heroes of the War of Independence". This proposal won government approval that same year. The date of the observance was chosen to match the date of the Kfar Etzion massacre, in which 127 defenders were killed in the final battle for Gush Etzion on May 13, 1948, the day before the State of Israel declared its independence. The formal decision that the day of the Yom HaZikaron observance would take place back-to-back the day before Independence Day was made in 1963.

In 2023, the Ministry of Diaspora Affairs and Combating Antisemitism announced a new policy that non-Israeli Jewish victims of antisemitic terror attacks outside of Israel should officially be mourned as part of each year's Yom HaZikaron commemoration. The policy was conceived as a way for Israel to demonstrate solidarity with the Jewish diaspora.

== Observance ==
Yom HaZikaron is the national remembrance day observed in Israel for all Israeli military personnel who lost their lives in the struggle that led to the establishment of the State of Israel and for those who have been killed subsequently while on active duty in Israel's armed forces. As of Yom HaZikaron 2022, that number was 24,213.

=== Preceding evening ===
The day opens with a siren the preceding evening at 20:00 (8:00 pm), given that in the Hebrew calendar system, a day begins at sunset. The siren is heard all over the country and lasts for one minute, during which Israelis stop everything, including driving on highways, and stand in silence, commemorating the fallen and showing respect.

By law, all places of entertainment are closed on the eve of Yom HaZikaron, and broadcasting and educational bodies note the solemnity of the day. Israeli television channels cease regular programming, and carry a screen displaying the names of all civilians killed in pogroms since 1851, and all fallen from 1860 (considered the date of the beginning of the Yishuv by the Israeli Ministry of Defense), in chronological order (rank, name, Hebrew date deceased and secular date) over the course of the day.

Since the founding of the state, Israel has chosen the Red Everlasting flower (Hebrew: דם המכבים, Dam HaMaccabim, 'blood of the Maccabees') as the national memorial flower. The flower is depicted in many memorial sites and can be seen worn as stickers on shirts and jackets throughout Yom HaZikaron. Since 2019, the non-profit organization Dam HaMaccabim, has been distributing pins with the real Red Everlasting flower throughout Israel and the United States.

=== Main memorial day ===
A two-minute siren is sounded at 11:00 the following morning, which marks the opening of the official memorial ceremonies and private remembrance gatherings at each cemetery where soldiers are buried.

Many Israelis visit the resting places of loved ones throughout the day.

National memorial services are held in the presence of Israel's top leadership and military personnel.

Memorial candles are lit in homes, army camps, schools, synagogues, and public places, and flags are lowered to half staff. Throughout the day, serving and retired military personnel serve as honor guards at war memorials throughout the country, and the families of the fallen participate in memorial ceremonies at military cemeteries.

Many traditional and religious Jews say prayers for the souls of the fallen soldiers on Yom HaZikaron. Special prayers prescribed by the Israeli rabbinate are recited. These include the recital of Psalm 9: "For the leader, on the death of the son," and Psalm 144: "Blessed be the Lord, My Rock, who traineth my hands for war and my fingers for battle" in addition to memorial prayers for the dead. The official ceremony to mark the opening of the day takes place at the Western Wall.

The day officially draws to a close at sundown (between 19:00 and 20:00; 7–8 p.m.) in a ceremony at the national military cemetery on Mount Herzl, marking the start of Israel Independence Day, when the flag of Israel is returned to full staff.

Scheduling Yom HaZikaron right before Independence Day is intended to remind people of the price paid for independence and of what was achieved with the soldiers' sacrifice. This transition shows the importance of this day among Israelis, most of whom have served in the armed forces, or have a connection with people who were killed during their military service.

== Timing ==
The normative day for Yom HaZikaron is the fourth day of the month of Iyar, with Yom HaAtzmaut following immediately on the next day (fifth of Iyar). This rarely occurs. The construction of the current Hebrew calendar allows these two dates to only occur on certain days of the week, but most of those possibilities will conflict with the Jewish Shabbat. The holidays are adjusted so neither falls out on the Shabbat, or even on Friday and Sunday. (Falling out on Friday would interfere with Shabbat preparation and cause overlap of the events on Friday evening. Falling out on Sunday would cause a similar conflict with the end of Shabbat on Saturday evening, as Yom HaZikaron always starts at 8:00, which might be earlier than dusk on Saturday night.)

The possible normative days and their adjustments are:

- Sunday-Monday: Yom HaZikaron would start 8:00 Saturday night. They are both pushed off a day to Monday the 5th of Iyar and Tuesday the 6th. Example: 2017 (5777)
- Tuesday-Wednesday: This is the only case without any conflict with the Shabbat, so no adjustment is needed and observance stays on normative dates of the 4th and 5th of Iyar. Example: 2023 (5783)
- Thursday-Friday: The end of Yom HaAtzmaut would run into the Shabbat (Friday evening). Holidays are advanced one day to Wednesday Iyar 3 and Thursday Iyar 4. Example: 2022 (5782)
- Friday-Saturday: Direct conflict with the full Shabbat. A single day move would not suffice, as advancing by one day would still leave Yom HaAtzmaut on Friday, bleeding into the Shabbat, and postponing one day would move Yom HaZikaron directly onto the Shabbat. Instead, they are advanced two days to Wednesday Iyar 2 and Thursday Iyar 3. Example: 2021 (5781)

No other combination is possible. The calendar never has the 4th and 5th on Monday-Tuesday, Wednesday-Thursday, or Saturday-Sunday.

== See also ==
- Culture of Israel
- Israeli casualties of war
- Martyrdom in Judaism
