= Herzl Day =

Israeli holiday

Herzl Day יום הרצל
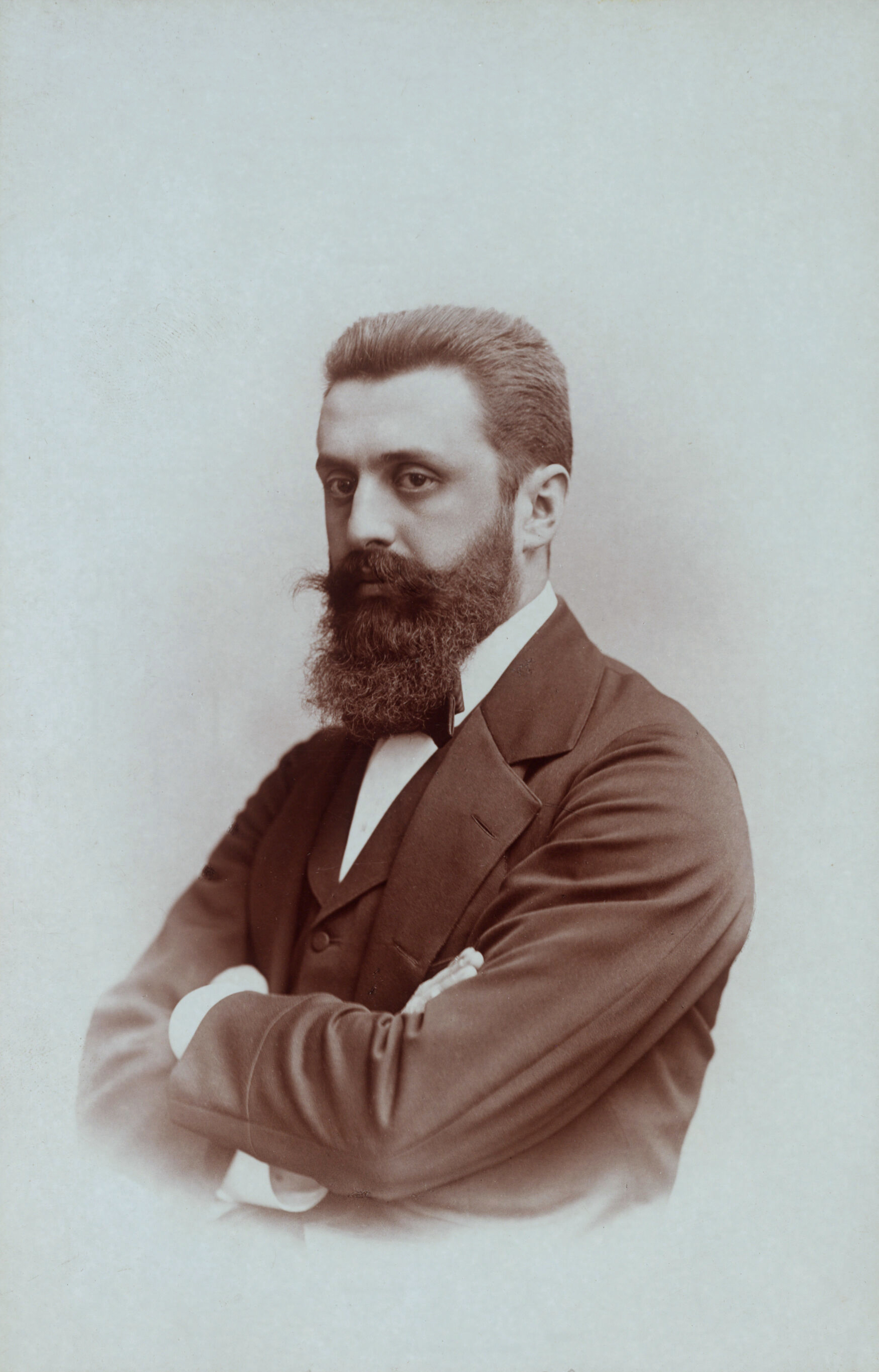
- Theodor Herzl
- Official name: Herzl Day Hebrew: יום הרצל
- Observed by: State of Israel
- Significance: Celebrating the life and vision of Zionist leader, Theodor Herzl.
- Begins: Iyar 10 (Hebrew calendar)
- Date: 10 Iyar
- 2025 date: May 8
- 2026 date: April 27
- Frequency: Annual

Herzl Day (Hebrew: יום הרצל) is an Israeli national holiday celebrated annually on the tenth of the Hebrew month of Iyar, to commemorate the life and vision of Zionist leader Theodor Herzl.

== History ==
Herzl Day was created by the Israeli Knesset as part of the Herzl Law. According to the law, passed in June 2004, Herzl Day will be celebrated once a year, on Iyar 10, the birthday of Theodor Herzl.

On this day, a state memorial service is held on Mount Herzl in Jerusalem and at IDF camps and schools. Time is devoted to learning about the achievements and Zionist vision of Theodor Herzl and a symposium in memory of Theodor Herzl is held in Jerusalem to discuss world Zionist issues. The Knesset holds a special session to mark Herzl Day.

If the Hebrew date, 10 Iyar, falls on Sabbath, Herzl Day is postponed until Sunday.

== See also ==
- Public holidays in Israel
- Culture of Israel
- Jewish holidays
