= Jabotinsky Day =

Israeli national holiday

Jabotinsky Day יוֹם־זַ׳בּוֹטִינְסְקִי
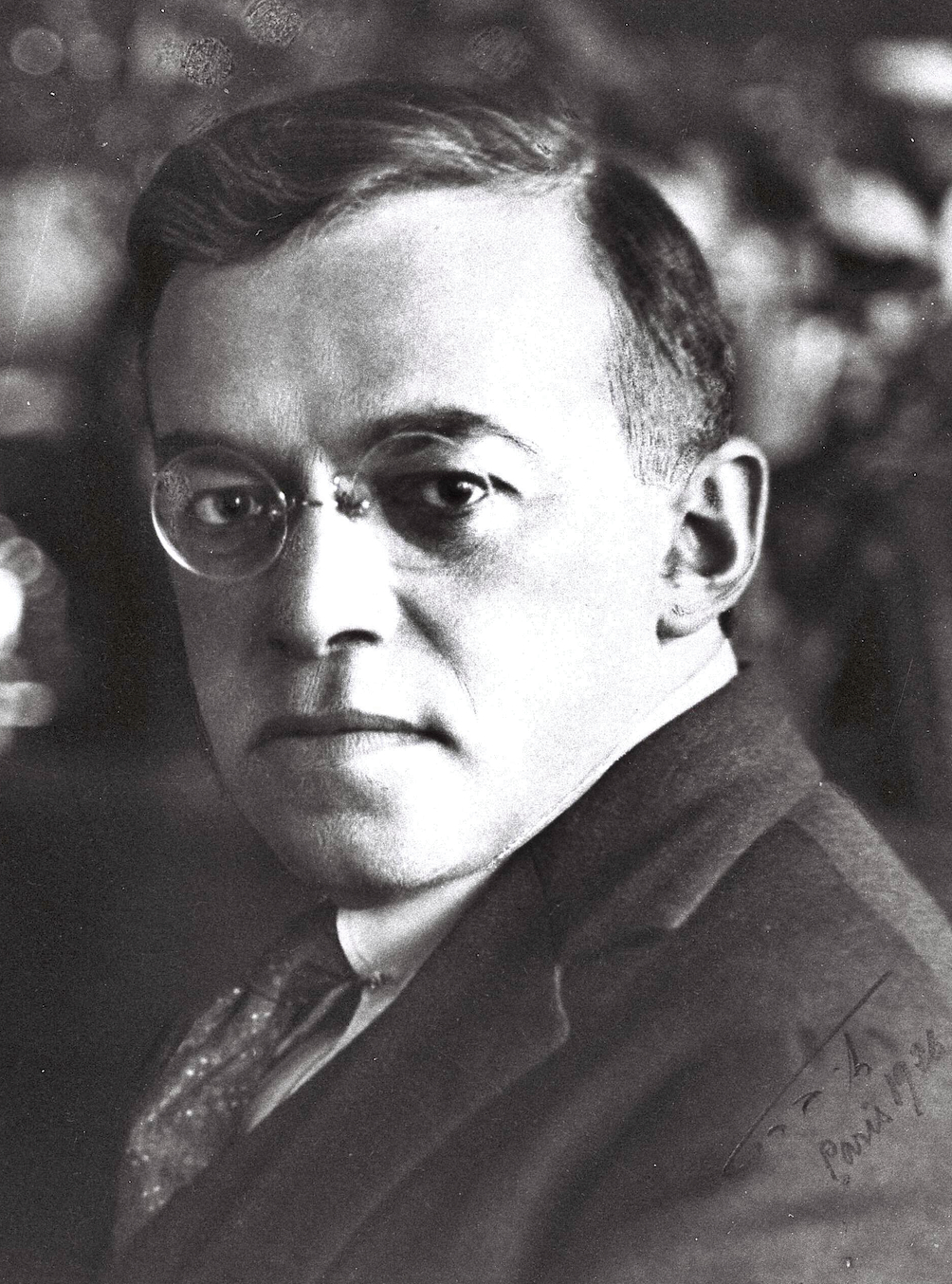
- Ze'ev Jabotinsky
- Official name: Jabotinsky Day Hebrew: יוֹם־זַ׳בּוֹטִינְסְקִי
- Observed by: State of Israel
- Type: National
- Significance: Celebrating the life and vision of Zionist leader, Ze'ev Jabotinsky.
- Begins: 29 Tammuz (Hebrew calendar)
- Date: 29 Tammuz
- 2024 date: August 4
- Frequency: Annual

Jabotinsky Day (Hebrew: יוֹם־זַ׳בּוֹטִינְסְקִי) is an Israeli national holiday celebrated annually on the twenty-ninth of the Hebrew month of Tammuz, to commemorate the life and vision of Zionist leader Ze'ev Jabotinsky.

== History ==
Jabotinsky Day was created by the Israeli Knesset as part of the Jabotinsky Law. According to the law, Jabotinsky Day is held once a year, on the 29th of Tammuz, the day of Ze'ev Jabotinsky's death. On this day; a state memorial service is held on Mount Herzl in Jerusalem. In IDF camps and schools, time is devoted to his achievements and Zionist vision. A symposium is organized by the Public Council and the Knesset holds a special session. If the 29th of Tammuz falls on a Sabbath, Jabotinsky Day is held on the following Sunday.

== See also ==
- Public holidays in Israel
- Culture of Israel
