= Cheshvan =

8th month of the Hebrew calendar

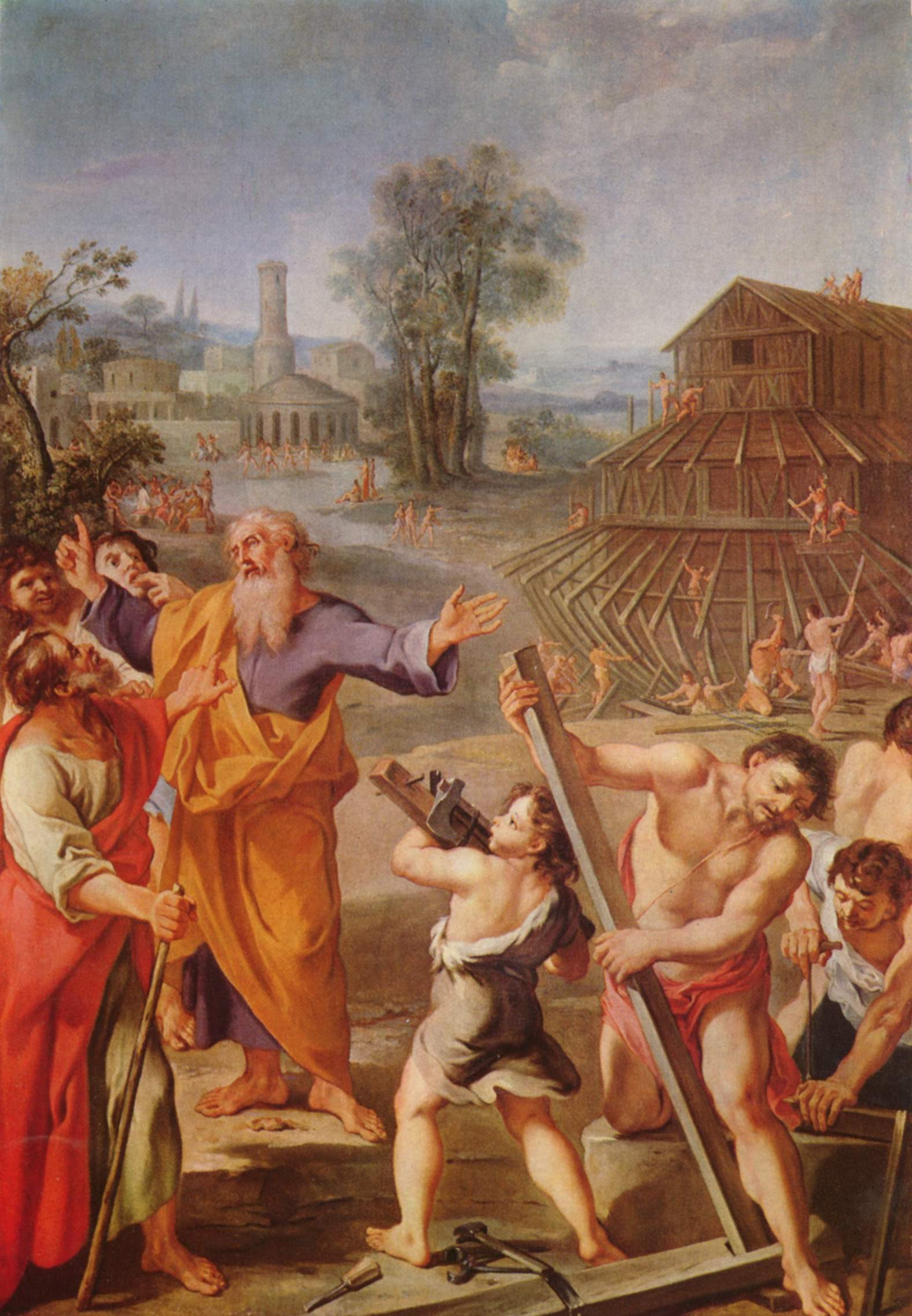
- The Great Flood, which according to the Bible wiped out the world, started in Marcheshvan.
- Native name: מַרְחֶשְׁוָן (Hebrew)
- Calendar: Hebrew calendar
- Month number: 8
- Number of days: 29 or 30
- Season: Autumn (Northern Hemisphere)
- Gregorian equivalent: October–November

Marcheshvan (Hebrew: מַרְחֶשְׁוָן, Standard Marḥešvan, Tiberian Marḥešwān; from Akkadian waraḫsamnu, literally, 'eighth month'), generally shortened to Cheshvan (חֶשְׁוָן, Standard Ḥešvan Tiberian Ḥešwān), is the second month of the civil year (which starts on 1 Tishrei), and the eighth month of the ecclesiastical year (which starts on 1 Nisan) on the Hebrew calendar.

In a regular (kesidran) year, Marcheshvan has 29 days, but because of the Rosh Hashanah postponement rules, in some years, an additional day is added to Marcheshvan to make the year a "full" (maleh) year. Marcheshvan occurs in October–November in the Gregorian calendar.

The Hebrew Bible, before the Babylonian Exile, refers to the month as Bul (1 Kings 6:38). In Sidon, the reference to Bul is also made on the Sarcophagus of Eshmunazar II dated to the early 5th century BC.

== Etymology ==
Compared to its Akkadian etymon waraḫsamnu, the name Marḥešvan displays the same lenition of ungeminated מ /m/ to ו /v/ found in other month names (Tammuz traditionally contains mem with dagesh). Uniquely to this name the initial ו has also changed to מ, giving the overall effect of a metathesis. In the modern form, with the connection to the roots w-r-ḥ ('moon', 'month') and š-m-n ('eight') no longer apparent, the first two letters מַר (mar) have been re-interpreted as the Hebrew word for 'bitter', alluding to the fact that the month has no holidays or fasts. In other contexts, the word מַר is attributed to mean droplet, associating this month with the rainy season.

== Events ==
- 7 Marcheshvan: The prayer V'tein tal u-matar ('deliver dew and rain') is added to the Shemoneh Esrei prayers in Israel. If no rain has fallen by the 17th of the month, special prayers are added for rain.
- Fast of Behav: According to the custom of most Eastern Ashkenazic communities, on the first Sabbath after Rosh Chodesh Cheshvan, a prayer is recited on behalf of all those who are going to fast on Bahab. Bahab, or in Hebrew בה"ב, stands for 2, 5, 2, i.e., Monday (2nd day of the week), Thursday (5th day), and another Monday. On the Monday, Thursday, and second Monday after the Sabbath, it is customary in many communities (mostly Ashkenazic, although there were some Sephardic communities who adopted this custom as well) to fast and/or to recite penitential prayers called Selichot. According to the Western Ashkenazic rite, as well as some Eastern Ashkenazic communities (especially Hungarian communities), the second Monday of Bahab is the Monday before Rosh Chodesh Kislev, the Thursday is the Thursday preceding that, the first Monday is the Monday preceding that, and the Sabbath in which the prayer is recited is the Sabbath preceding that. Bahab is also observed at the beginning of Iyar; in Iyar it is observed at the beginning of the month in both Eastern and Western Ashkenazic rites.
- Sigd: The Ethiopian Jewish community celebrates Sigd on the 29th day of Marcheshvan, 50 days from Yom Kippur, analogous to counting 50 days from Pesach to Shavuot. Israel officially recognized Sigd as a national holiday in 2008, and it is observed annually on 29 Cheshvan.

== In Jewish history and tradition ==
- 8 Marcheshvan (66 CE) – Jewish nationalists defeat the Romans at the famous Beth Horon Pass, killing 5,300 footmen and 380 horsemen
- 11 Marcheshvan (circa 2105 BCE) – Methuselah dies at age 969
- 11 Marcheshvan (circa 1553 BCE) – Death of Rachel while giving birth to Benjamin
- 12 Marcheshvan (1995) – Assassination of Yitzhak Rabin; now a national memorial day
- 15 Marcheshvan – King Jeroboam's alternative feast of Sukkot for the people of the northern Kingdom (1 Kings 12:32–33)
- 15 Marcheshvan (165 BCE) – Death of Matityahu (Mattathias), who began the Maccabean revolt in the city of Modiin
- 16 Marcheshvan (1938) – Kristallnacht/Pogromnacht: 1,400 synagogues and numerous copies of the Tanakh are purposefully and systematically set on fire and allowed to burn in Nazi Germany
- 16 Marcheshvan (1994) – Death of Reb Shlomo Carlebach
- 17 Marcheshvan (circa 960 BCE) – First Temple completed by King Solomon (it was not inaugurated until the following Tishrei however)
- 20 Marcheshvan (1860) - Birth of Rabbi Sholom Dovber Schneersohn, the 5th Chabad Rebbe.
- 23 Marcheshvan (164 BCE) – Hasmonean holiday commemorating the removal from the Holy Temple of altar stones which were defiled by the Greeks

== See also ==
- Jewish astrology
