= Ben-Gurion Day =

Israeli national holiday

Ben-Gurion Day יום בן-גוריון
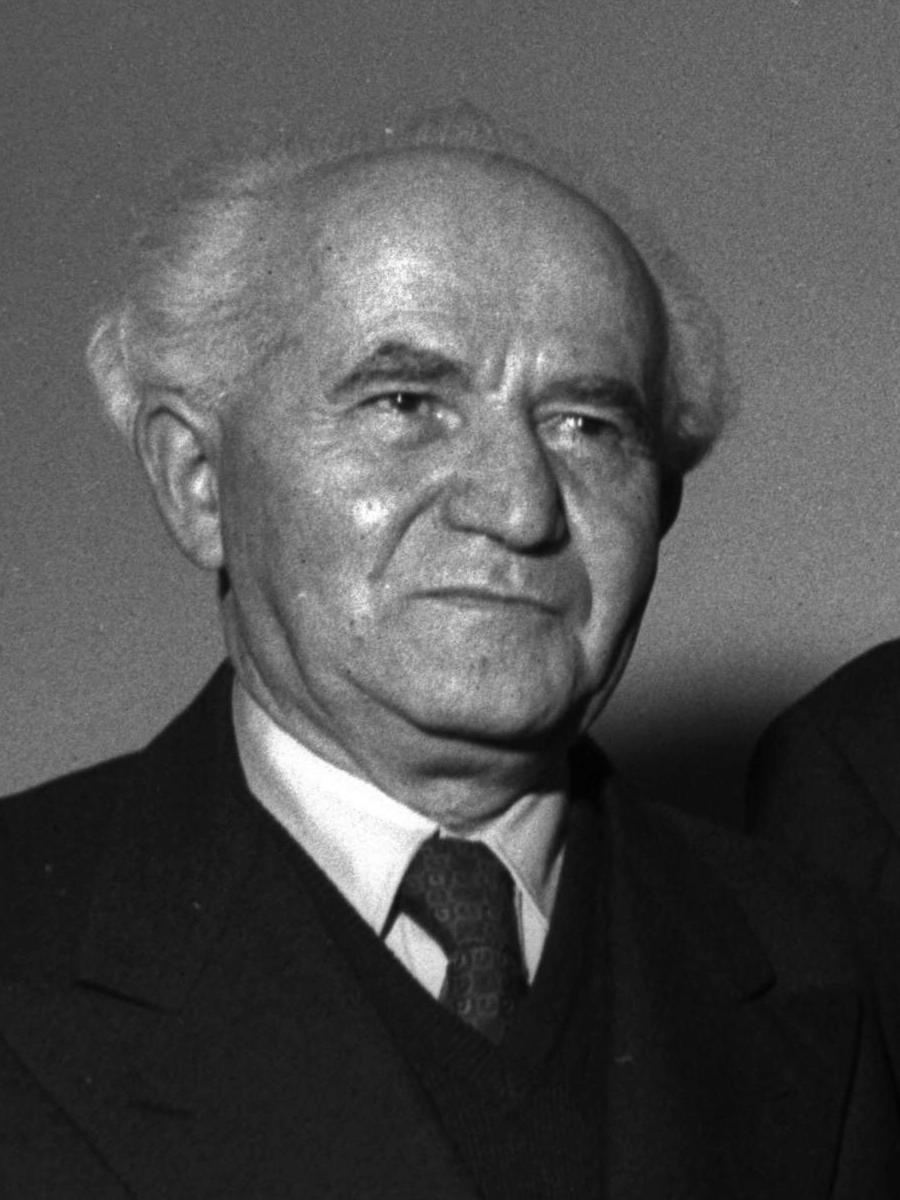
- David Ben-Gurion
- Official name: Ben-Gurion Day Hebrew: יום בן-גוריון
- Observed by: State of Israel
- Type: National
- Significance: Celebrating the life and vision of Zionist leader and Israel's First Prime Minister, David Ben-Gurion.
- Date: 6 Kislev (Hebrew calendar)
- 2024 date: December 8
- 2025 date: November 26
- Frequency: Annual

Ben-Gurion Day (Hebrew: יום בן-גוריון) is an Israeli national holiday celebrated annually on the sixth of the Hebrew month of Kislev, to commemorate the life and vision of Zionist leader, and Israel's first Prime Minister David Ben-Gurion.

== History ==
Ben Gurion Day was created by the Israeli Knesset as part of the Ben-Gurion Law. According to the law, Ben-Gurion Day shall be held once a year, on Kislev 6, the date of David Ben-Gurion's death. On this day state memorial services shall be marked by the institutions of the State of Israel, on bases of the Israel Defense Forces, and in schools. If the sixth of Kislev falls on Shabbat eve, or on Shabbat, the memorial day shall be held on the following Sunday.

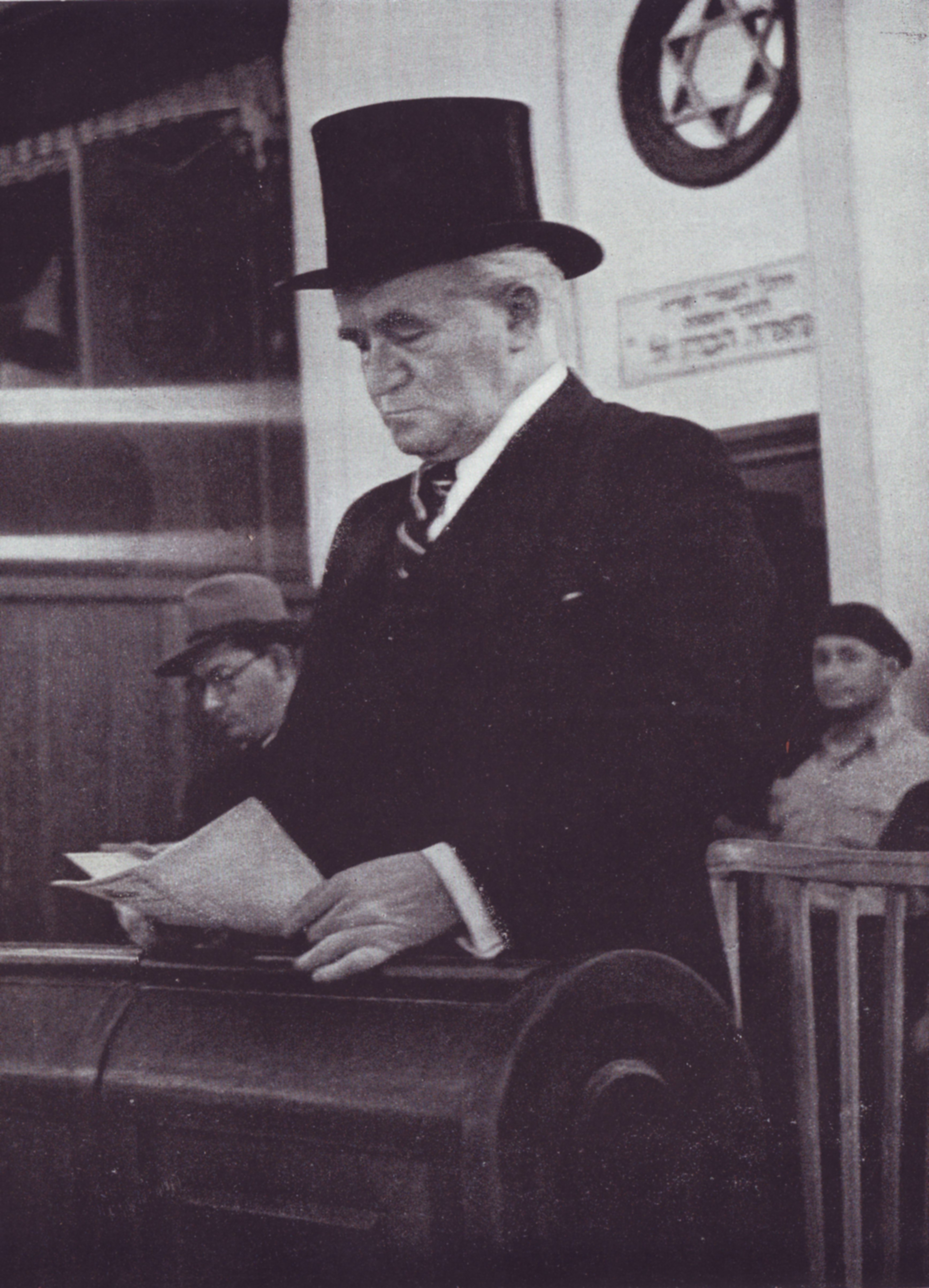
David Ben Gurion

== See also ==
- Public holidays in Israel
- Culture of Israel
- Jewish holidays
