= Tammuz (Hebrew month) =

4th month of the Hebrew calendar

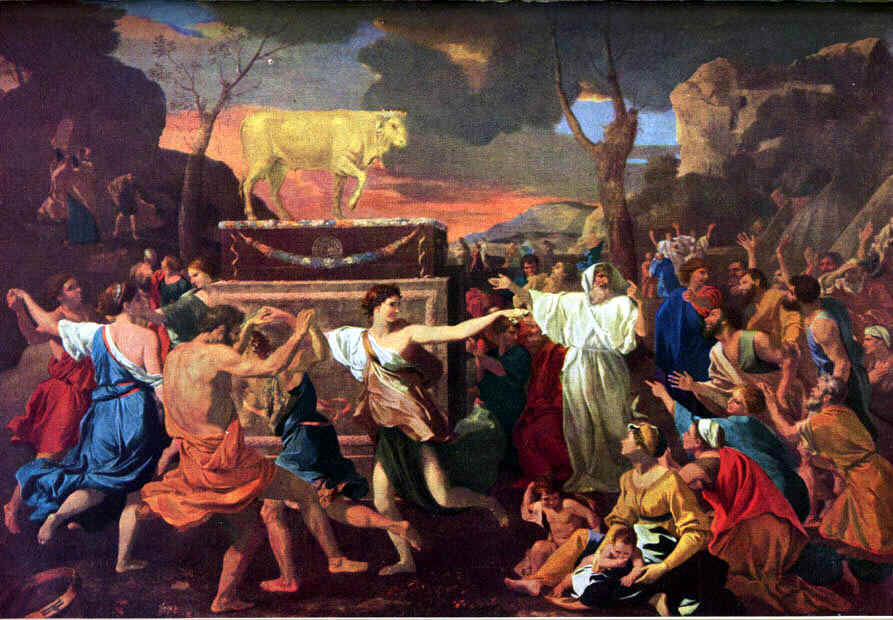
- Tammuz is the month of the sin of the golden calf, which resulted in Moses breaking the tablets of the Ten Commandments.
- Native name: תַּמּוּז (Hebrew)
- Calendar: Hebrew calendar
- Month number: 4
- Number of days: 29
- Season: Summer (Northern Hemisphere)
- Gregorian equivalent: June–July
- Significant days: Gimmel Tammuz Seventeenth of Tammuz

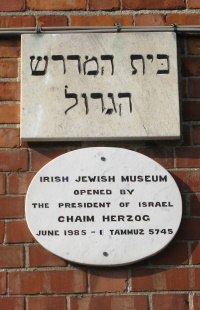
Inscription at the Irish Jewish Museum, with Gregorian and Hebrew dates.

Tammuz (Hebrew: תַּמּוּז, Tammūz), or Tamuz, is the tenth month of the civil year and the fourth month of the ecclesiastical year on the Hebrew calendar, and the modern Assyrian calendar. It is a month of 29 days, which occurs on the Gregorian calendar around June–July.

The name of the month was adopted from the Assyrian and Babylonian month Araḫ Dumuzu, named in honour of the Mesopotamian deity Dumuzid.

== Holidays ==
3 Tammuz – Gimmel Tammuz – is a Chabad holiday that marks the anniversary of the passing of Rabbi Menachem Mendel Schneerson, the seventh Rebbe of the Chabad-Lubavitch Hasidic dynasty.

17 Tammuz – Seventeenth of Tammuz – is a fast day from 1 hour before sunrise to sundown in remembrance of Jerusalem's walls being breached. 17 Tammuz is the beginning of The Three Weeks, in which Jews follow similar customs as the ones followed during the Omer from the day following Passover until the culmination of the mourning for the death of the students of Rabbi Akiva (the 33rd day of the Omer – such as refraining from marriage and haircuts.) The Three Weeks culminate with Tisha B'Av (9th of Av).

Ashkenazi communities refrain from wine and meat from the beginning of the month of Av, while Sefardi communities only do so from the second day of the month. The mourning continues until noon on the 10th of Av, the date on which the Second Temple's destruction was complete.

== In Jewish history ==
- 3 Tammuz (c. 1272 BCE) – Joshua stops the sun (Book of Joshua, 10:1–15)
- 3 Tammuz (1994) The passing of the 7th Rebbe of Chabad, Menachem Mendel Schneerson.
- 3 Tammuz (1982) – Death of Rabbi Shneur Kotler, Rosh Yeshiva of Beth Medrash Govoha of Lakewood, New Jersey.
- 4 Tammuz (1171) – Death of Rabbeinu Tam
- 4 Tammuz (1286) – Meir of Rothenburg imprisoned
- 5 Tammuz (c. 592 BCE) – Ezekiel receives his "Chariot" vision (Book of Ezekiel, 1:4–26)
- 6 Tammuz (1976) – Operation Entebbe
- 9 Tammuz (c. 586 BCE) – Jerusalem walls breached by Nebuchadnezzar II, a date observed as a fast day until the second breaching of Jerusalem's walls by the Roman Empire on the 17th of Tammuz (70 CE)
- 15 Tammuz (1743) – Death of Chaim ibn Attar
- 17 Tammuz (c. 1312 BCE) – golden calf offered by the Jewish people, 40 days after the giving of the Torah at Har Sinai. In response, Moses smashed the first Tablets. This is the first of the five national tragedies mourned on this day.
- 17 Tammuz (c. 586 BCE) – The korban in Solomon's Temple were discontinued.
- 17 Tammuz (70) – Walls of Jerusalem breached by the Roman army.
- 17 Tammuz (135) The Roman general Apostomus burned the Torah and placed an idol in the Second Temple.
- 21 Tammuz (1636) – Death of the Kabbalist Baal Shem Elijah Loans, grandson of Johanan Luria and Josel of Rosheim, and author of the Miklol Yofi (Amsterdam, 1695) commentary on Ecclesiastes.
- 21 Tammuz (2020) The last Remaining Jews of Yemen are captured by the Houthi Militia
- 22 Tammuz (1792) – Death of Rabbi Shlomo of Karlin
- 23 Tammuz (1570) – Death of Rabbi Moses ben Jacob Cordovero
- 26 Tammuz (2005) – Death of Rabbi Shlomo Zev Zweigenhaft
- 28 Tammuz (1841) – Death of Rabbi Moshe Teitelbaum (Ujhel)
- 29 Tammuz (150) – Death of Johanan HaSandlar
- 29 Tammuz (1105) – Death of Rashi
- 29 Tammuz (1940) – Death of Ze'ev Jabotinsky; secular observance by Israel as Jabotinsky Day

== In fiction ==
- In the story of Xenogears, Tammuz is the name of a country, named after the Hebrew month. In the official Japanese version translation, however, it was transliterated Tamuzu. This was later further changed by the translation process to "Thames" for the English version.

== See also ==
- Jewish astrology
- "Tammūz" (Arabic: ﺗﻤﻮﺯ), is also the name for the month of July in Iraq, the Levant and Turkey ("Temmuz" in Turkish). In Syriac it is ܬܡܘܙ. In Lebanon, Syria, and the Palestinian territories, the 2006 Lebanon War is generally known as حرب تموز Ḥarb Tammūz (i.e. the July War), following the Arab custom of naming the Arab-Israeli wars after months or years.
