= Iyar =

2nd month of the Hebrew calendar

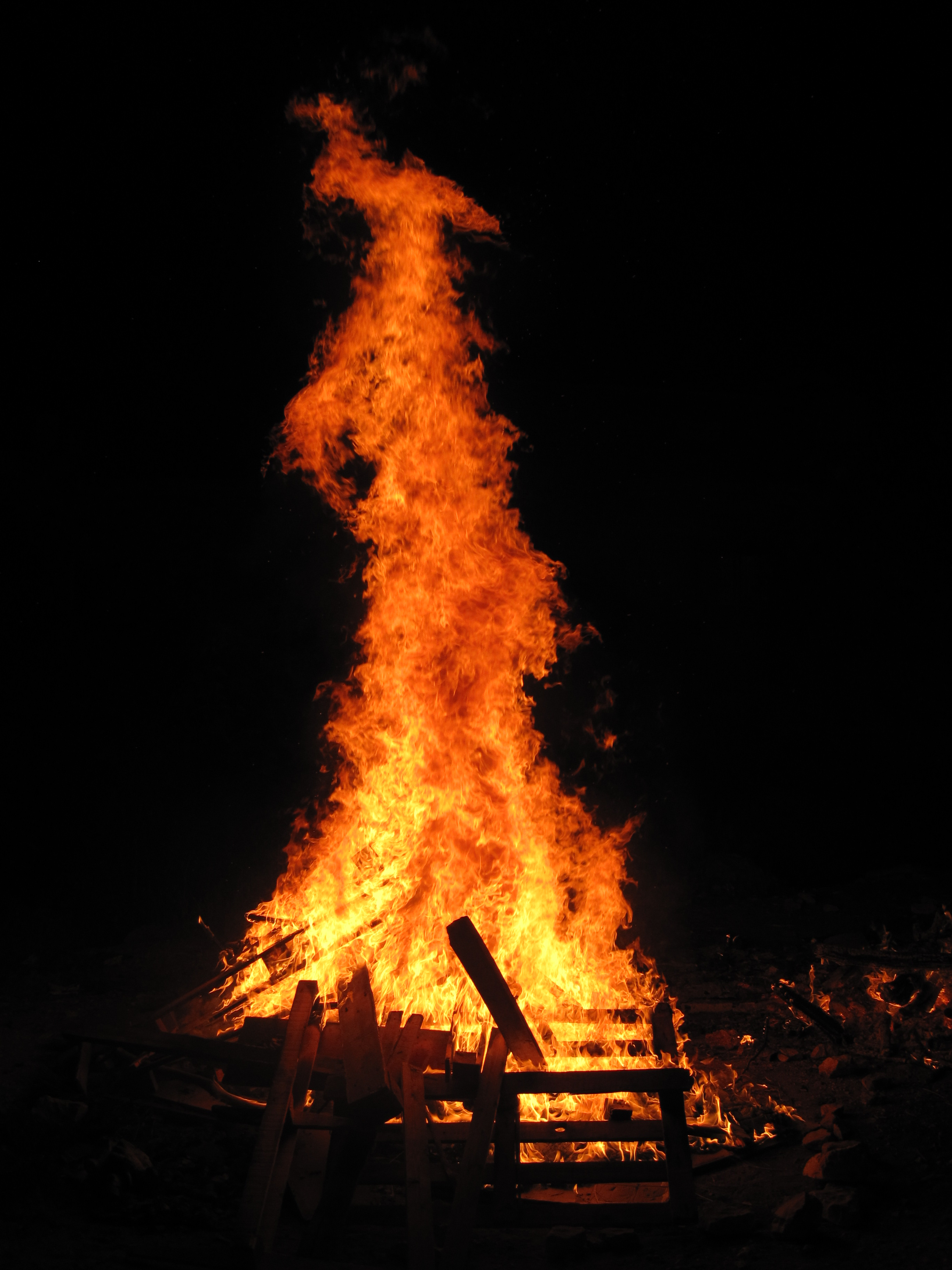
- A bonfire in Israel on Lag BaOmer celebrated on the 18th of Iyar
- Native name: אִיָּיר (Hebrew)
- Calendar: Hebrew calendar
- Month number: 2
- Number of days: 29
- Season: Spring (Northern Hemisphere)
- Gregorian equivalent: April–May
- Significant days: Pesach Sheni; Lag BaOmer

Iyar (Hebrew: אִיָּיר or אִיָּר, Standard ʾĪyyar Tiberian ʾĪyyār; from Akkadian: 𒌗𒄞 ^{iti}ayari "rosette; blossom") is the eighth month of the civil year (which starts on 1 Tishrei) and the second month of the Jewish religious year (which starts on 1 Nisan) on the Hebrew calendar. The name is Babylonian in origin. It is a month of 29 days. Iyar usually falls in April–May on the Gregorian calendar.

In the Hebrew Bible, before the Babylonian captivity, the month was called Ziv (זו, 1 Kings 6:1, 6:37). Ziv is a Hebrew word that means "light" or "glow".

Along with all other current, post-biblical Jewish month names, Iyar was adopted during the Babylonian captivity. In the Babylonian calendar its name was Araḫ Āru, which can be interpreted as "month of blossoming".

== Holidays ==
=== Jewish holidays ===
- 14 Iyar – Pesach Sheni
- 18 Iyar – Lag BaOmer
- Fast of Behav – see Cheshvan. It is observed on the Monday, Thursday, and Monday after the first Sabbath after Rosh Chodesh Iyar. Unlike in Cheshvan, the Eastern and Western Ashkenazic rites observe it at the same time.

=== Israeli holidays ===
- 4 Iyar – Yom HaZikaron
- 5 Iyar – Independence Day (Israel)
- 10 Iyar – Herzl Day
- 28 Iyar – Jerusalem Day

== In Jewish history ==
- 1 Iyar (1788) - Death of Rabbi Menachem Mendel of Vitebsk.
- 2 Iyar (1834) - Birth of the Rebbe Maharash, 4th Chabad Rebbe.
- 4 Iyar (1165) – Maimonides survives a fierce storm at sea while fleeing from the Islamic persecution in Fez. From then on he observed the day as a personal day of fasting and prayer.
- 5 Iyar (1948) – Israeli Declaration of Independence on Friday, 14 May 1948, before sunset.
- 6 Iyar (1937) - The Peel Commission publishes its report, recommending for the first time the partition of Mandatory Palestine into Jewish and Arab states.
- 7 Iyar (498 BCE) – Jerusalem's rebuilt walls are dedicated nearly 88 years after their destruction by Nabû-kudurri-uṣur (Nebuchadnezzar II) of the Neo-Babylonian Empire.
- 8 Iyar (1096) – Rhineland massacres of the First Crusade begin – On their way to Holy Land, small bands of knights and peasants, along with local inhabitants, the "People's Crusade", attacked many Jewish communities, most notably in the Rhineland towns of Worms and Mainz. On Shabbat, 8th of Iyar, the Jews of Speyer were also attacked. However, most of them were allowed refuge in the bishop's castle and neighbouring towns such as Heidelberg. (See Sivan in Jewish History" for Sivan 1).
- 9 Iyar (1941) - The Farhud pogrom erupts in Baghdad, marking a decisive break in the history of Iraqi Jewry and accelerating Jewish emigration from Iraq after nearly 2,600 years of continuous presence.
- 10 Iyar (circa 2870/2871 BC) Death of Eli the High Priest and his two sons.
- 10 Iyar (1103) – Death of Isaac Alfasi
- 10 Iyar (1860) – Birthday of Theodor Herzl
- 11 Iyar (1510) – 1500 Jewish books were confiscated in the Free City of Frankfurt at the instigation of an apostate.
- 11 Iyar (1881) – Pogroms in Wasilków and Konotop as Jews are blamed for the assassination of Tsar Alexander II of the Russian Empire, who was assassinated in a suicide attack by the Catholic Russified Pole Ignacy Hryniewiecki. Riots continued for three years across all of Russia.
- 11 Iyar (1948) – Battle at Degania – The Israeli Army defeated the advancing Syrian Armed Forces, following the shelling at the entrance of Deganya, which began at sunrise and lasted nine hours. It is considered the first Israeli victory of 1948 Arab–Israeli War.
- 13 Iyar (1427) – Jews expelled from Bern, Switzerland
- 14 Iyar (1312 BCE) – "Second Passover" – an additional opportunity to offer the paschal sacrifice, for individuals who were impure on the main Passover holiday. (Book of Numbers, 9).
- 14 Iyar (2nd century BC) – Death of Rabbi Meir
- 14 Iyar (1605) – Jews of Bisenz, part of Austrian Bohemia, were massacred by Stephen Bocskai, Prince of Transylvania
- 14 Iyar (1933) – Nazis burned thousands of books written by Jews.
- 14 Iyar (1960) – Adolf Eichmann captured in Buenos Aires.
- 15 Iyar (1727) – Jews expelled from Ukraine by Empress Catherine I a few months prior to her death.
- 15 Iyar (1883) – Pogrom in Rostov-on-Don with the encouragement of local Russian officials.
- 15 Iyar (1939) – The Nuremberg laws, depriving Jews the rights citizenship, were passed by the government of Nazi Germany in 1935. In 1939, on the 16th of Iyar, the laws went into effect in Nazi-allied Hungary.
- 15 Iyar (1945) – Dachau concentration camp liberated by the 45th Infantry Division of the US Army.
- 17 Iyar (66 CE) – Jews attack and defeat the Roman garrison in Jerusalem, following the theft of silver from the Holy Temple.
- 17 Iyar (1793) – Death of the Noda B'Yehudah
- 17 Iyar (1945) – Death of Adolf Hitler
- 18 Iyar (circa 120 CE) – A plague which killed 24000 of Rabbi Akiva's disciples ceases.
- 18 Iyar (Second century CE) – Death of Shimon bar Yochai On the day of his death—Iyar 18, the 33rd day of the Omer Count—Rabbi Shimon gathered his disciples and revealed many of the deepest secrets of the divine wisdom, and instructed them to mark the date as "the day of my joy."
- 18 Iyar (circa 1573) – Death of Moses Isserles, who is regarded as the definitive Halachic authority for Ashkenazi Jews.
- 18 Iyar (1690) – Ettingen Jews acquitted of a blood libel, avoiding the danger of the decree to destroy their synagogue were they to be found guilty. The local Jews celebrated this day as a local "Purim" celebration-day of thanksgiving.
- 18 Iyar (1948) – Israel Defense Forces created.
- 18 Iyar (1948) – Hurva Synagogue captured and dynamited by the Arab Legion of Jordan during the battle for Old Jerusalem. The synagogue was built by the group of disciples of the Vilna Gaon who immigrated from Lithuania in 1864. The synagogue was built on the ruins of the synagogue built by Judah HeHasid) and his disciples in 1700, which was destroyed by Arab mobs in 1721. It was therefore named the "Hurvat Rabbi Judah HaChassid"—the ruins of Rabbi Judah the Chassid, or simply "The Hurva"—The Ruin.
- 19 Iyar (1293) – Death of Meir of Rothenburg in his cell in Ensisheim Fortress where he had been imprisoned for ten years in an attempt to exact a huge ransom from the Jewish community. The money had been raised, but Rabbi Meir refused to have himself redeemed, lest this encourage the hostage taking of other Jewish leaders. (see Adar 4)
- 19 Iyar (1815) - Death of Menachem Mendel of Rimanov
- 19 Iyar (1945) – Joseph Goebbels commits suicide as World War II nears its end.
- 20 Iyar (circa 1312 BCE) – The Israelites departed their encampment near Mount Sinai.
- 20 Iyar (1288) – Thirteen Troyes Jews burned at the stake by the Inquisition for supposedly murdering a Christian child. The thirteen Jews chosen were from among the richer members of the community. Jews were also killed in a "blood libel" in Neuchâtel, Switzerland on this date.
- 20 Iyar (1637) – Venetian Jews forbidden the right to practice law or to act as advocates in the Courts of the Republic of Venice.
- 20 Iyar (1939) – Mount Scopus Hospital opened on Mount Scopus, Jerusalem. The hospital, designed by renowned Bauhaus architect Erich Mendelsohn, opened as a modern, 300-bed academic medical facility.
- 20 Iyar (1942) – All pregnant women in Kovno Ghetto sentenced to death by the Nazis.
- 22 Iyar (1731) – Jewish books begin to be searched for and confiscated by Giovanni Antonio Costanzi, the Vatican librarian and author of a catalogue of the Vatican's Hebrew manuscripts, in all the Jewish quarters throughout the Papal States. More confiscations continued over the next twenty years.
- 22 Iyar (1944) – Two months after the Nazi occupation of Hungary, Nazis began deportation of Hungarian Jews to the Auschwitz concentration camp. Adolf Eichmann personally oversaw the following day the start of the extermination process. Eight days later an estimated 100,000 had been murdered.
- 23 Iyar (1096) - Massacre of 800 Jews in Worms, Germany - this day was observed as a day of communal fasting in Worms for centuries to come.
- 24 Iyar (1945) – Nazi Germany surrenders to Allied Forces
- 25 Iyar (1096) – Cologne Jews saved – During the First Crusade, the crusaders are locked out of the city in the commune of Cologne in the Rhineland and local Jews are saved, following the orders of the local bishop to close the gates to the city. In a number of local provinces, where the local bishop tried to avert the masses from harming the Jews, the bishop would have to escape for his own safety.
- 25 Iyar (1355) – Toledo Massacre – 1200 Jews massacred by an attack led by Henry II of Castile during a civil war on the Alcaná, the judería of Toledo
- 26 Iyar (942) – Death of Saadia Gaon.
- 26 Iyar (1747) – Death of Moshe Chaim Luzzatto in a plague in Acre.
- 26 Iyar (1945) - 26 of Iyar - Day of Liberation and Rescue has been established as an official day to remember the date of the liberation from Nazi Germany, 26th of Iyar in the Hebrew calendar. The holiday was initiated by German Zakharyayev, Gorsky-Kavkazi Jewish philanthropist and businessman, and supported by Rabbis of Europe and Israel. The day was also recently accepted by the Israeli government.
- 26 Iyar (1945) – Theresienstadt concentration camp liberated by the Soviets.
- 26 Iyar (1967) – Six-Day War begins.
- 28 Iyar (1967) – Jerusalem conquered during the Six-Day War. The day is marked in Israel as "Jerusalem Day".
- 28 Iyar (circa 1012 BCE) – Death of Samuel the Prophet, marked by pilgrimages to his tomb on the outskirts of Jerusalem. Many Jews consider this a Ta'anit Tzadik and fast.

== See also ==
- Jewish astrology
- In Arabic, Ayyar or Eyyar (Arabic: أيّار) refers to the month of May.
