= Sigd =

Israeli national holiday

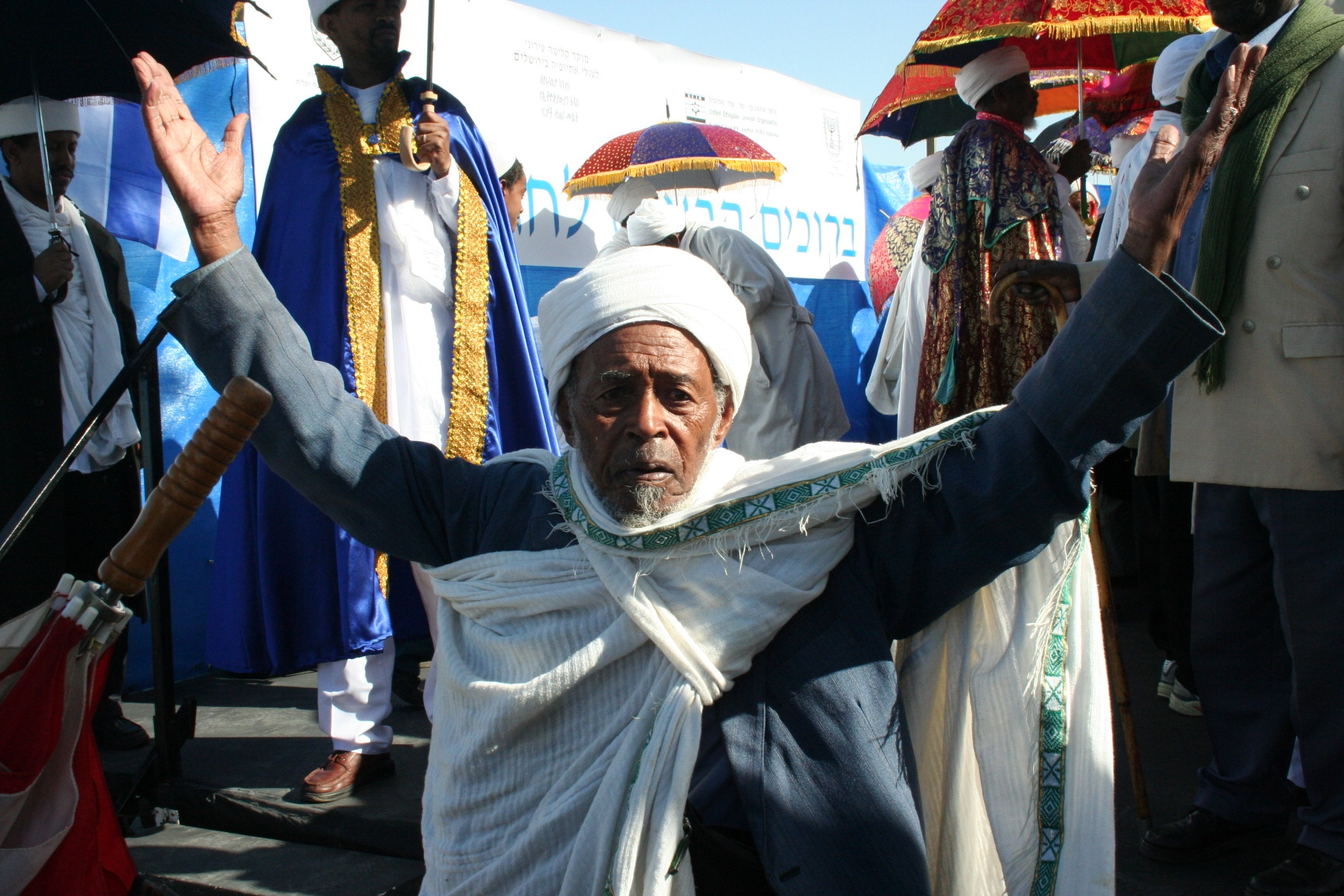
- Kessim celebrate Sigd in Jerusalem, 2009.
- Official name: Mehlella
- Also called: Amata Saww
- Observed by: Israel
- Date: 29th day of Cheshvan
- 2025 date: Sunset, 19 November – nightfall, 20 November
- 2026 date: Sunset, 8 November – nightfall, 9 November
- 2027 date: Sunset, 28 November – nightfall, 29 November
- 2028 date: Sunset, 17 November – nightfall, 18 November

Sigd (Ge'ez: ስግድ, lit. 'Prostration'; Hebrew: סִגְד or Hebrew: סִיגְד; also romanized Sig'd, Siged or Seg'd), also known as Mehella (ምህላ, 'Supplication') or Amata Saww (ዐመተ ሰወ, 'Grouping Day'), is one of the unique holidays of the Beta Israel, the Ethiopian Jewish community, and is celebrated on the 29th of the Hebrew month of Marcheshvan, 50 days after Yom Kippur.

The holiday centers on the renewal of the covenant between God and the people of Israel, communal repentance and introspection, and the yearning for Jerusalem and Zion.

In 2008, the Knesset enacted the Sigd National Holiday Law, recognizing Sigd as an official Israeli state holiday and establishing 29 Marcheshvan as its date. The law also provides for a central state ceremony and educational activities concerning the holiday.

== Date ==
Previously, Sigd was celebrated on the 29th of Kislev, and after a calendar reform in the mid-19th century it was moved to its present day, 50 days after Yom Kippur.

== Etymology ==
The word Sigd itself is Ge'ez for "prostration" and is related to Imperial Aramaic: סְגֵד sgēd "to prostrate oneself (in worship)". The Semitic root sgd is the same as in mesgid, one of the two Beta Israel Ge'ez terms for "synagogue" (etymologically related to Arabic: مَسْجِد masjid "mosque", literally "place of prostration"), and from the same Semitic root we also have the Hebrew verb לסגוד lisgod, "to worship".

== Significance ==
There are multiple oral traditions about the origin of Sigd. One tradition traces it to the 6th century, in the time of King Gebre Mesqel of Axum, son of King Kaleb, when the war between Jews and Christians ended and both communities separated from each other. Another traces it to the 15th century as a result of persecution by Christian emperors. One other tradition states that the Jews in Persia, following the destruction of the First Temple would climb a mountain, face Jerusalem, and pray to be allowed back. The first mention of Sigd is from the 15th century.

Sigd symbolizes the acceptance of the Torah. The kahənat (priests) have also maintained a tradition of the holiday arising as a result of persecution by Christian kings, during which the kahənat retreated into the wilderness to appeal to God for His mercy. Additionally, they sought to unify the Beta Israel and prevent them from abandoning the Haymanot (laws and traditions) under persecution. So they looked toward the Book of Nehemiah, taking inspiration from Ezra's presentment of the "book of the law of Moses" before the assembly of Israel after it had been lost during the Babylonian exile.

== Historicity ==
While it is widely thought that Sigd is a holiday particular to Ethiopian Jews, Rabbi Sharon Shalom posits that it was once known to all Jews but was preserved only by the Ethiopian Jewish community, based on Shir HaShirim Rabbah 7:4:

Rabbi Yehoshua ben Levi said: By rights, the Eighth Day of Assembly (Shemini Atzeret) should have followed Sukkot after an interval of fifty days, as Shavuot follows Pesaḥ. But since at the Eighth Day of Assembly summer passes into autumn, the time is not suitable for traveling. To what may this be compared? A king had several married daughters, some living nearby, while others were a long way away. One day they all came to visit their father, the king. Said the king: “Those who are living nearby are able to travel at any time. But those who live at a distance are not able to travel at any time. So while they are all here with me, let us make one feast for all of them and rejoice with them.” So with regard to Shavuot, which comes when winter is passing into summer, God says, “The season is fit for traveling.” But the Shemini Atzeret comes when summer is passing into autumn, and the roads are dusty and hard for walking; hence it is not separated by an interval of fifty days. Said the Holy One, blessed be He: “These are not days for traveling; so while they are here, let us make of all of them one festival and rejoice.” Therefore Moses admonishes Israel, saying to them, “On the eighth day you shall have a solemn assembly” (Numbers 29:35).

== Event ==
Traditionally in commemoration of the appeals made by the Kessim and consequent mass gathering, the Beta Israel would make pilgrimages to Midraro, Hoharoa, or Wusta Tsegai (possibly marking locations of relief from Christian persecution) every year to reaffirm themselves as a religious community. Ascending up the mountain ritually commemorates the giving of the Torah at Mt. Sinai.

Today, during the celebration, members of the community fast, recite Psalms, and gather in Jerusalem where Kessim read from the Orit (the Octateuch). The ritual is followed by the breaking of the fast, dancing, and general revelry.

== Official national holiday in Israel ==
In February 2008 MK Uri Ariel submitted legislation to the Knesset in order to establish Sigd as an Israeli national holiday, and in July 2008 the Knesset "decided to officially add the Ethiopian Sigd holiday to the list of State holidays." According to an opinion piece in the Jerusalem Post newspaper, however, "While the qessotch [Kessim] and Beta Israel rabbis are pleased that the Sigd became an official Israeli state holiday in 2008, they would also like the holiday to become an integral part of the yearly Jewish holiday cycle and be embraced by more Jews, at least in Israel, rather than remain a holiday primarily celebrated by the Jewish community from Ethiopia."

Israeli President Isaac Herzog celebrated Sigd with the Ethiopian Jewish community on the Armon Hanatziv Promenade in November 2021. In his speech, he hailed Sigd as “a holiday of victory” and praised the Ethiopian Jewish community for its proactive efforts to immigrate to Israel. In 2025, Avera Mengistu, recently returned from Hamas captivity of a decade, celebrated Sigd in Jerusalem, making national news.

== Observance outside of Israel ==
In 2025, a Sigd celebration took place at City Hall in New York City, the first Sigd event in the United States sponsored by a municipal government. The event was sponsored by the Mayor’s Office for the Prevention of Hate Crimes, and the nonprofit Bechol Lashon, which highlights racial and ethnic diversity within Jewry. Organizers noted the city's sizable population of Ethiopian Jews, living alongside the city's larger Jewish community.

== See also ==
- Public holidays in Ethiopia
