= Yishai (name) =

Yishai (Hebrew: יִשַׁי, Modern: Yišay, Tiberian: Yīšáy) is a Hebrew given name and surname. It is the origin of the English given name Jesse, and is the original Hebrew name of Jesse father of David. Variant spellings include Yishay, Ishay, Yshai, and Yeshay. There is also a derived patronymic surname Ben-Yishai.

== Given name ==
- Isai Scheinberg (born c. 1946), Israeli online gambling entrepreneur
- Ishay Hadas (born 1955), Israeli television producer
- Yishai Beer (born 1956), Israeli Defense Forces general
- Yishay Yafeh (born 1962), Israeli economist
- Yishai Levi (born 1963), Israeli musician
- Yishai Sarid (born 1965), Israeli writer and lawyer
- Yishay Garbasz (born 1970), Israeli artist
- Ishai Golan (born 1973), Israeli actor
- Yishai Schlissel (born 1975), Israeli man convicted for murder
- Yishai Fleisher (born 1976), Israeli settler in Hebron
- Ishay Berger (born 1978), Israeli musician
- Yishai Romanoff (born 1986), American musician
- Ishay Ribo (born 1989), Israeli singer-songwriter
- Yshai Oliel (born 2000), Israeli tennis player
- Ishai Setton (fl. 2002–present), American film director

== Surname ==
- Ron Ben-Yishai (born 1943), Israeli journalist
- Galia Yishai (1950–2020), Israeli actress and singer
- Shefi Yishai (born 1954), Israeli composer
- Orit Ishay (born 1961), Israeli artist
- Eli Yishai (born 1962), Israeli politician
- Micheline Ishay (born 1962), American political theorist
- Ran Ichay (born 1970), Israeli diplomat
- Jeffrey Yishai (born 1975), Israeli footballer
- Melissa Ben-Ishay (born 1984), American cupcake company executive
- Talia Ishai (born 1994), Israeli musician
- Stephanie Ben-Ishai (fl. 2003–present), Canadian law professor
