= Hebrew University Business School =

Israeli business school

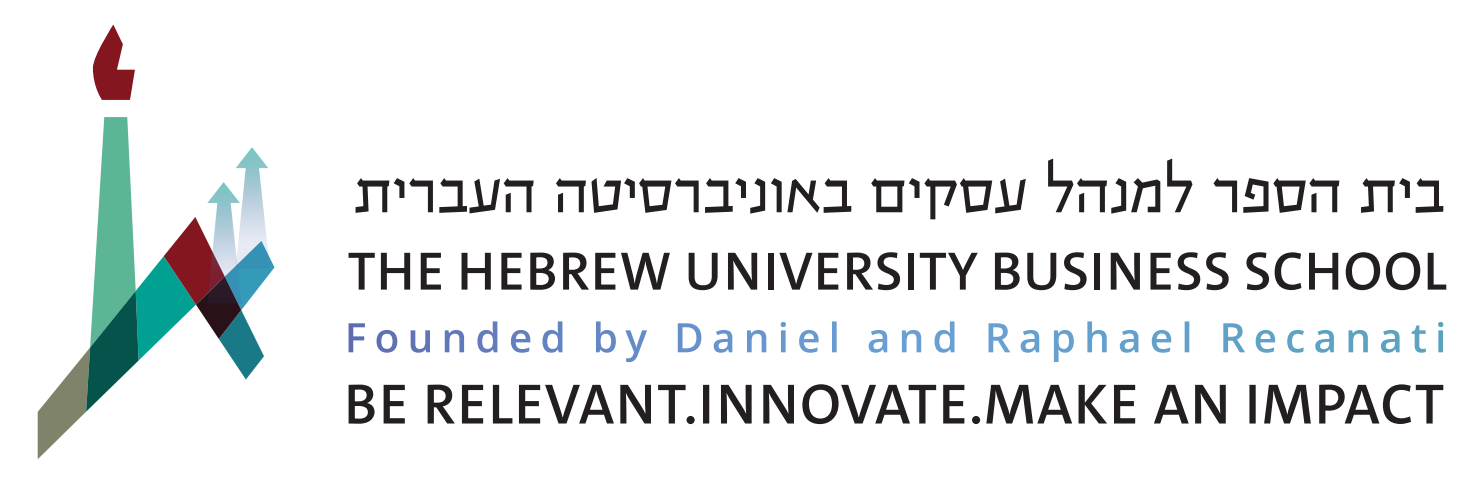
- Type: Private business school
- Established: 1952; 74 years ago
- Founders: Daniel and Raphael Recanati
- Parent institution: The Hebrew University
- Dean: Orly Sade
- Students: 1,500
- Location: Mount Scopus, Jerusalem, Israel
- Campus: Urban
- Website: bschool-en.huji.ac.il

The Hebrew University Business School (also known as "HUBS") is the business school of The Hebrew University and based in Mt. Scopus, Jerusalem. Founded in 1952 by Daniel and Raphael Recanati, the Hebrew University Business School has consistently been rated as one of the top business schools in the country and is AACSB-accredited, placing it in the same list as Harvard and Yale.

Since its establishment at the Hebrew University of Jerusalem, the School's goal has been to develop the next generation of business leaders, advance and contribute to the field of business management.

The Hebrew University Business School awards undergraduate degrees in the disciplines of Business Administration, Accounting, and offers Master of Business Administration degrees at the postgraduate level with multiple specializations. Their international programs include a multidisciplinary Bachelor of Arts, and two 1-year MBA programs: Med-Tech Innovation and StartUp 360.

Since 2024, Professor Orly Sade has served as Dean. Notable faculty members include Zvi Wiener, Haim Levi, Eugene Kandel, Dan Galai, Renana Peres, and Gur Mosheiov.

== History ==
The Hebrew University Business School was founded in 1952 as a department in the Social Sciences Faculty. The school was the first academic institute in Israel to provide academic and professional training in business administration.

During its first years, the school offered graduate-level courses in business administration. Over time, the number of programs was expanded and more specializations were offered under the guidance of a diversified faculty.

Today, the school consists of over 100 administrative and academic faculty members who represent the diverse fields of research: finance and banking, organizational behavior, human resource management, marketing, fintech, strategy and entrepreneurship, biomedical management, and operational research.

In the history of Israel academia, the Hebrew University Business School was the first to appoint a woman as a professor in finance, Professor Orly Sade.

== Programs ==
WIth an average of 1500 students, the Hebrew University Business School offers an array of programs with competitive entry requirements.

Hebrew-language programs:

- B.A. in Business Administration
- B.A. in Accounting
- Accelerated B.A. to MBA track for outstanding students
- MBA programs
- M.A. in Financial Economics
- Ph.D. program

English-language programs:

- B.A. in Business Administration (interdisciplinary international program)
- MBA programs
- Ph.D. program

The School also offers an English-language summer program, the Transdisciplinary Innovation Program (TIP), open to internal and external students. The program includes a demo project, field trips and guest lectures.

As part of the School's international outlook and commitment to the global business ecosystems, student exchanges are also offered and encourage. These are in addition to international collaborative programs such as the San Diego Immersion program with the University of San Diego, and the McGill Summer Program with McGill University. The School maintains global paternships with leading academic and business institutions all over the world.

Faculty members are at the forefront of knowledge in their fields and teach material parallel to that studied in the most prestigious academic institutions in the world.

== MBA Programs ==
The Hebrew University Business School's MBA programs equip students with the skill set to analyze, synthesize and utilize "big picture” thinking to meet the demands of a competitive and increasingly complex business world.

In the Hebrew-language program students can choose to specialize in the following fields:

- Finance and Banking
- Fintech
- Marketing
- Organizational Behavior and Human Resource Management
- Data Science
- Strategy and Entrepreneurship
- Operations Research and Management
- Big Data Analytics
- Biomedical Management

For international students and those wishing to study in English, the School offers two MBA tracks that include a year-long internship:

- Med-Tech Innovation
- StarUp 360

== Ranking ==
The Hebrew University Business School is part of the Hebrew University of Jerusalem which is in the world's top-100 universities. The university ranked 81st in the International Shanghai Ranking, making it the best university in Israel.

== Deans ==
- 1998–2005 Jonathan Kornbluth
- 2005–2009 Tsvi Piran
- 2009–2013 Dan Galai
- 2013–2016 Yishay Yafeh
- 2016–2020 Zvi Wiener
- 2020–2024 Nicole Adler
- 2024-present Orly Sade
