= Yeshay =

Yeshay may refer to:

- Yeshe or Yeshay, a Tibetan given name meaning "wisdom"
- Yishai (name) or Yeshay, a Hebrew given name

== See also ==
- Jesse, father of the biblical David
