= Orly Sade =

Israeli professor of financial economics (born 1969)

- אורלי שדה
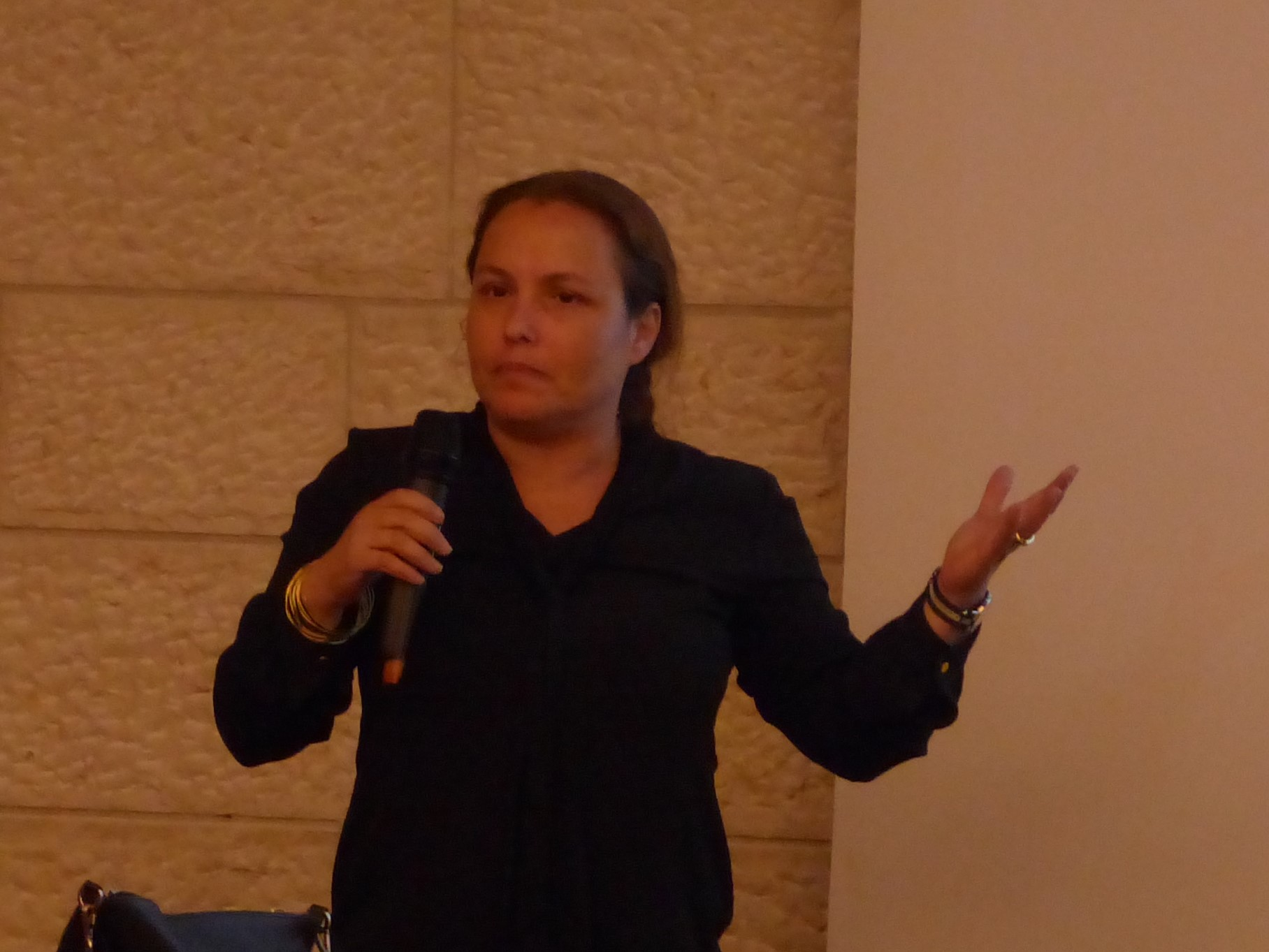
- Born: 1969 (age 56–57)

Academic background
- Education: Tel Aviv University (BA, MBA); University of Utah (PhD)

Academic work
- Discipline: Economist
- Sub-discipline: Behavioral finance; Experimental finance
- Institutions: Hebrew University of Jerusalem
- Main interests: Financial auctions; Market microstructures; Crowdfunding

Orly Sade (Hebrew: אורלי שדה; born 1969) is a financial economist based out of the Hebrew University of Jerusalem who has been noted for her research regarding behavioral and experimental finance and crowdfunding platforms. She is the Israel Professor of Finance at the Department of Finance, School of Business Administration at the Hebrew University of Jerusalem. Since 2024, she has been serving as the Dean of the School of Business Administration at the Hebrew University of Jerusalem. She is the first female professor in the field of finance at Hebrew University.

== Education and academic career ==
Sade obtained a Bachelor of Arts in Business Administration and Economics as well as an MBA in Business Administration at the Tel Aviv University, Israel. In 2001 she completed her Ph.D. in Finance at the David Eccles School of Business at the University of Utah.

Since 2023 Sade has been a Professor of Finance at the Department of Finance, School of Business Administration, Hebrew University of Jerusalem, where she served as director of the BA program. Since 2024, she has been the Dean of the School of Business Administration at the Hebrew University of Jerusalem. She is the first woman in Israel to become an Associate Professor with tenure in the field of Finance.

In the past, Sade worked as a visiting Associate Professor in different universities such as Stern School of Business, NYU, IE in Madrid, EIEF in Rome, NES in Moscow and at NYU Shanghai. Sade is an experimental economist based at the Hebrew University of Jerusalem. Sade has been noted for her research with Dan Marom regarding crowdfunding platforms. She is the first female professor in the field of finance at Hebrew University.

== Other work ==
Besides her academic work, Sade, advises financial institutions and companies in the fields of finance, debt offerings, and tenders. Since 2017, she has been a director at Clal Insurance company.

In the past, Sade worked in the Banking Supervision Department of the Bank of Israel and was a member of the advisory board of the Israeli Ministry of Finance as well as the board of directors of the Israeli Securities Authority. She also served as a member of the investment committee for the “Hadassah” pension fund and the Investment Committee of the Hebrew University Workers Fund. Sade was a member of the board of directors of the Hebrew University provident fund and an outside director at Sigma Mutual Funds.

== Research ==
Sade's main fields of research are behavioral and experimental finance, financial auctions and market microstructures, the design of financial markets as well as crowdfunding. Her research is published in scientific Journals and presented at conferences worldwide. She received academic grants and awards including multiple grants from the Israel Science Foundation as well as the Abe Gray awards from the President of the Hebrew University. Sade has conducted research into pensions and found that people with less financial knowledge are less likely to take advantage of their available options. She has also found that people with good finances check their financial options more often than those with poor finances, who tend to "bury their heads in the sand."

== Main publications ==
- Hurwitz, A., & Sade, O. (2024). Is One Plus One Always Two? Insuring Longevity Risk While Having Multiple Saving Accounts. Management Science.
- Meloso, D., Izhakian, Y., & Sade, O. (2024). Experimental Finance: Introduction to the Special Issue. Quarterly Journal of Finance, 14(2).
- Hurwitz, A., Mitchell, O. S., & Sade, O. (2022). Testing Methods to Enhance Longevity Awareness. Journal of Economic Behavior and Organization, 204, 466-467.
- Haran Rosen, M., & Sade, O. (2022) The Disparate Effect of Nudges on Minority Groups. The Review of Corporate Finance Studies (RCFS).
- Haran Rosen, M., & Sade, O. (2022) Investigating the Introduction of Fintech Advancement Aimed to Reduce Limited Attention Regarding Inactive Savings Accounts – Data, Survey and Field Experiment. forthcoming AEA Papers and Proceedings.
- Hurwitz, A., Mitchell, O. & Sade, O. (2021) Longevity Perceptions and Saving Decisions during the Covid-19 Outbreak: An Experimental Investigation. AEA Papers and Proceedings. 111, pages 297-301
- Gafni, H., Marom, D., Robb, A. & Sade, O. (2020) Gender Dynamics in Crowdfunding: (Kickstarter): Evidence on Entrepreneurs, Backers, and Taste-Based Discrimination. The Review of Finance.
- Mugerman, Y., Winter, E. & Sade, O. (2020), Out-Of-Pocket vs. Out-Of-Investment in Financial Advisory Fees: Evidence from the Lab. Journal of Economic Psychology.
- Hurwitz, A., Sade, O. & Winter, E. (2020) Can Mandatory Minimum Annuity Laws Have Unintended Consequences? An Experimental Study. Journal of Economic Behavior & Organization, Volume 169, pp. 208–222.
- Hurwitz, A. & Sade, O. (2020) An Investigation of Time Preferences, Life Expectancy and Annuity versus Lump-Sum Choices – Can Smoking Harm Long-Term Saving Decisions? Journal of Economic Behavior & Organization, volume 180, pages 812-825.
- Gafni, Marom & Sade. (2018) Are the Life and Death of an Early Stage Venture Indeed in the Power of the Tongue? Lessons from Online Crowdfunding Pitches. Strategic Entrepreneurship Journal (SEJ), 2018, pp. 1-21.
- Mugerman, Sade, & Shayo. (2014). Long term saving decisions: financial reform, peer effects and ethnicity. Journal of Economic Behavior & Organization, 106, 235-253
- Camargo, Schnitzlein, Zender, & Sade. (2012). Divisible good auctions with asymmetric information: an experimental examination. Journal of financial and quantitative analysis, 48(4), 1271-1300
- Camargo, Schnitzlein, Zender, & Sade. (2013). On the persistence of overconfidence: evidence from multi- unit auctions. journal of behavioral finance.
- Brenner, Galai & Sade. (2009). Sovereign debt auctions: uniform or discriminatory? Journal of monetary economics, 56(2), 267-274.
- Galili & Sade. (2006). "The ostrich effect" and the relationship between the liquidity and the yields of financial assets. The journal of business, 79(5).
- Schnitzlein, Zender & Sade. (2006). When less (potential demand) is more (revenue): asymmetric bidding capacities in feasible good auctions. The review of finance (ROF), 10(3), 389-416.
- Schnitzlein, Zender & Sade. (2006). Competition and cooperation in feasible good auctions: an experimental examination. The review of financial studies (RFS), 19(1), 195-235.
- Kalay, Wohl & Sade. (2004). measuring stock illiquidity: an investigation of the demand and supply schedule at the TASE. The journal of financial economics, 74(3), 461-486.
- Crowley & Sade. (2004). Does the option to cancel an order in a double auction market matter? The economics letters, 83(1), 89-97.
- Brenner, Galili & Sade. (2010). A Note on Sovereign Debt Auctions: Uniform or discriminatory? In R. W. Kolb, J. Wiley & Sons, Inc., Sovereign Debt: From Safety to Default (119-127). New Jersey: John Wiley & Sons, Inc.
- Brenner, M., Galai, D. & Sade, O. (2016) Uniform or Discriminatory Auctions: Endogenizing Bidder’s Choice in Divisible Good Auctions In Behavioral Finance: Where do Investors Biases Come From"? edited by Itzhak Venezia.
- Zur, E. & Sade, O. (2011). Baseball and the art of fair value: Do managers or the prediction markets make better predictions? In I. Venezia & Z. Wiener., Bridging the GAAP: Recent advanced in finance and accounting (63-93). Singapore: World Scientific Publishing Co. Pte. Ltd.

== Books ==
Sade co-authored a children's book that teaches young people some of the basics of economics:

• Sade, O. & Neurborne, E. (2011). How Ella Grew An Electric Guitar. New York: CreateSpace Independent Publishing Platform (110 Pages)

== Social initiatives ==
In 2024, Sade initiated the project "In Their Memory and Honor" to commemorate the fallen women of Operation Iron Swords, in collaboration with the Hebrew University of Jerusalem and Clal Insurance. As part of the project, a connection was established between female reservist students from the School of Business Administration at the Hebrew University and the families of the women from the security forces who fell during Operation Iron Swords. The students and the families met at a memorial ceremony, where the families awarded scholarships to the participating students, sponsored by Clal Insurance.
