= Yom HaAliyah =

Israeli national holiday

Yom HaAliyah יום העלייה
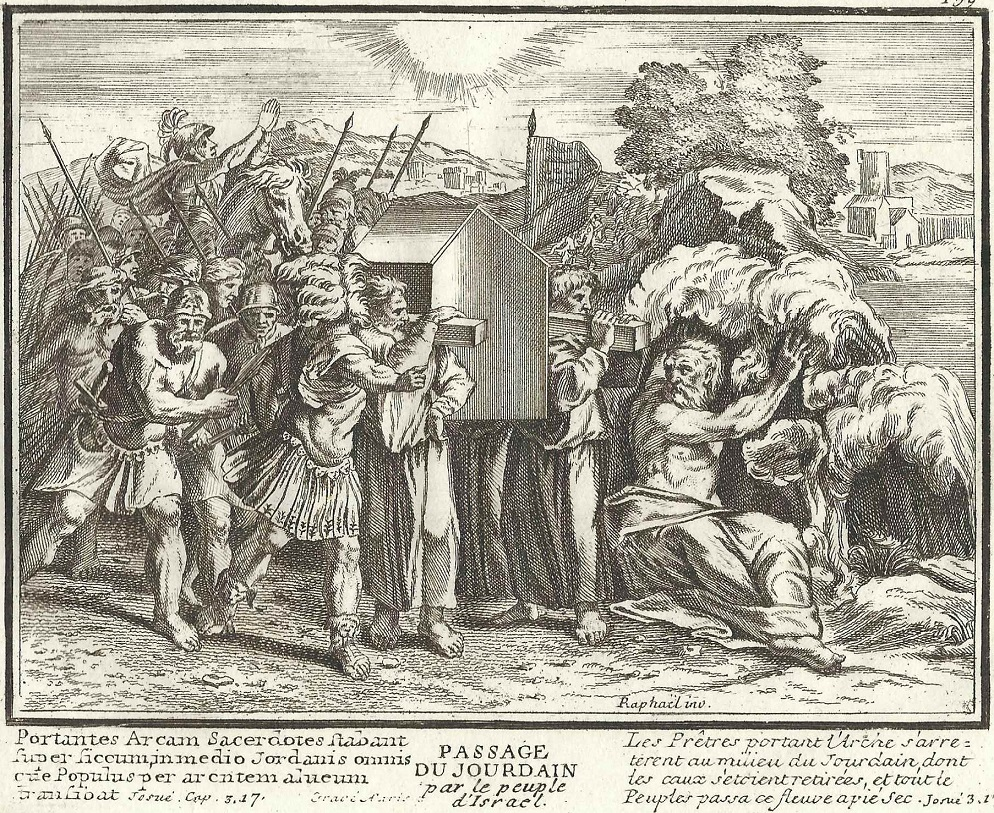
- Joshua Leading the Israelites Across the Jordan River on the 10th of Nisan
- Official name: Yom HaAliyah (Aliyah Day) Hebrew: יום העלייה
- Observed by: State of Israel
- Significance: Celebrating Jewish immigration to Israel
- Begins: Nisan 10 (Hebrew calendar) & Observed in schools Cheshvan 7 (Hebrew calendar)
- Date: 10 Nisan national holiday & observed in schools 7 Cheshvan
- 2025 date: Sunset, 7 April – nightfall, 8 April (hist.); Sunset, 28 October – nightfall, 29 October (obs.)
- 2026 date: Sunset, 27 March – nightfall, 28 March (hist.); Sunset, 17 October – nightfall, 18 October (obs.)
- 2027 date: Sunset, 16 April – nightfall, 17 April (hist.); Sunset, 6 November – nightfall, 7 November (obs.)
- 2028 date: Sunset, 5 April – nightfall, 6 April (hist.); Sunset, 26 October – nightfall, 27 October (obs.)
- Frequency: Annual

Yom HaAliyah, or Aliyah Day (Hebrew: יום העלייה), is an Israeli national holiday celebrated annually on the tenth of the Hebrew month of Nisan to commemorate the Jewish people entering the Land of Israel which the Hebrew Bible says happened on the tenth of the Hebrew month of Nisan. The holiday was also established to establish aliyah, immigration of Jews to Israel, as a core value of the State of Israel, and honor the contributions of olim, Jewish immigrants, to Israeli society. Yom HaAliyah is also observed in Israeli schools on the seventh of the Hebrew month of Cheshvan.

The opening clause of the Yom HaAliyah Law states in Hebrew:

מטרתו של חוק זה לקבוע יום ציון שנתי להכרה בחשיבותה של העלייה לארץ ישראל כבסיס לקיומה של מדינת ישראל, להתפתחותה ולעיצובה כחברה רב־תרבותית, ולציון מועד הכניסה לארץ ישראל שאירע ביום י׳ בניסן.

English translation:

The purpose of this law is to set an annual holiday to recognize the importance of Jewish immigration to the Land of Israel as the basis for the existence of the State of Israel, its development and design as a multicultural society, and to mark the date of entry into the Land of Israel that happened on the tenth of Nisan.

== History ==
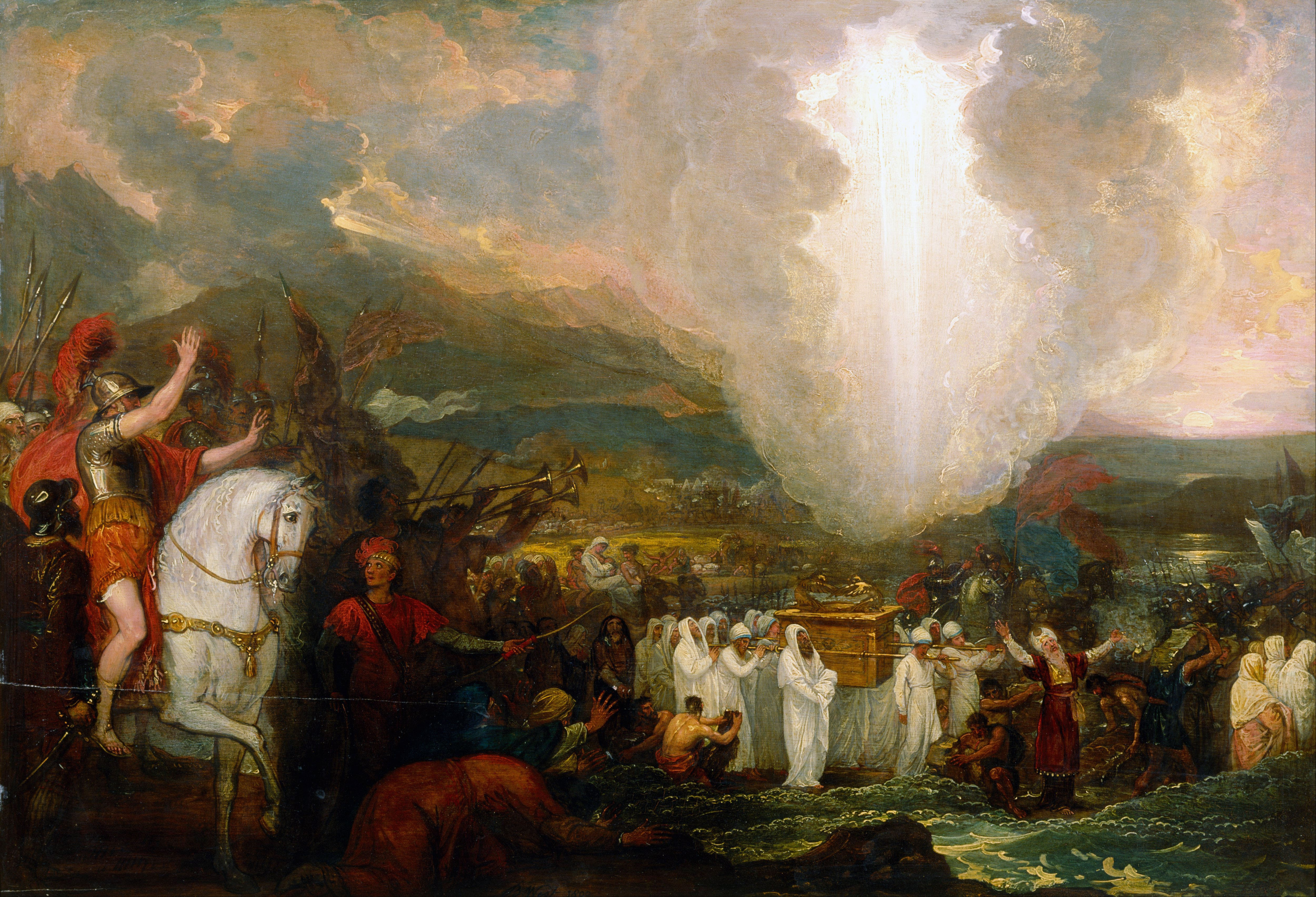
Joshua Leading the Israelites Across the Jordan River into the Land of Israel on the 10th of Nisan, Benjamin West

Yom HaAliyah, as a modern holiday celebration that led to the Knesset law, began in 2009 as a grassroots community initiative and young Olim self-initiated movement in Tel Aviv, spearheaded by the TLV Internationals organization of the Am Yisrael Foundation. On June 21, 2016 the Twentieth Knesset voted in favor of codifying the grassroots initiative into law by officially adding Yom HaAliyah to the Israeli national calendar. The Yom HaAliyah bill was co-sponsored by Knesset members from different parties in a rare instance of cooperation across the political spectrum of the opposition and coalition. The key Knesset parliamentarians who initially worked on the final successful version of the Yom HaAliyah bill were Miki Zohar of Likud, Hilik Bar of Israeli Labor Party, and Michael Oren of Kulanu. There were previous failed attempts in other Knesset sessions to create similar legislation, none of which were related to the ultimate successful creation of the holiday, namely Knesset members Avraham Neguise, Yoel Razvozov, Robert Ilatov, Ya'akov Katz with his Knesset aide Yishai Fleisher.

== Significance ==
The original calendar date chosen for Yom HaAliyah, the tenth of Nisan, is laden with symbolism. Although a modern holiday created by the Knesset of Israel, the tenth of Nisan is a date of religious significance for the Jewish people as recounted in the Hebrew Bible and in traditional Jewish thought. Additionally, the observation date of 7 Cheshvan was chosen due to its proximity to the weekly Torah portion Parashah of Lech Lecha, in which God commanded Abraham to go to the Land of Israel.

=== Biblical ===
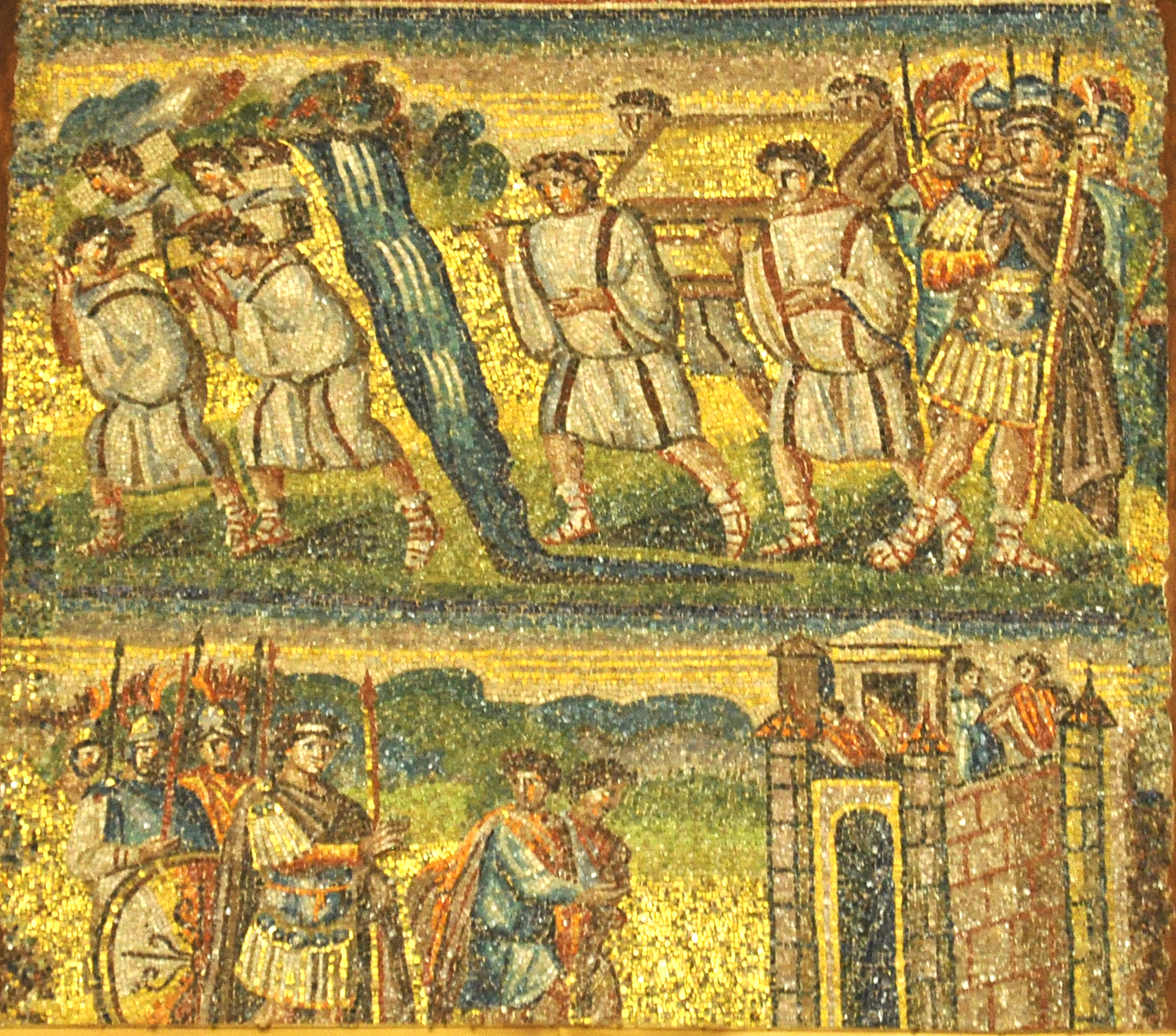
5th Century mosaic depicting the Ark of the Covenant carried by the Israelites across the Jordan River into the Land of Israel on the 10th of Nisan led by Joshua

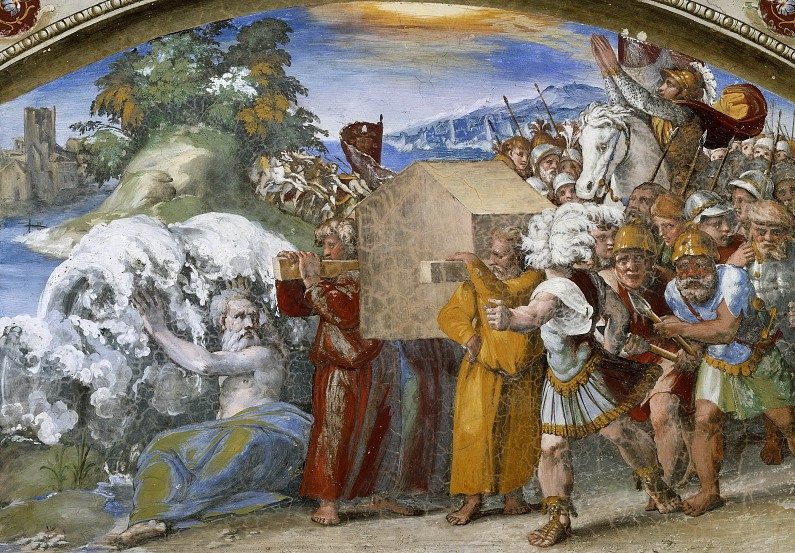
The Ark carried by the Israelites over the Jordan River into the Land of Israel on the 10th of Nisan by Italian Renaissance painter Raphael

On the tenth of Nisan, according to the biblical narrative in the Book of Joshua, Joshua leading the Israelites crossed the Jordan River at Gilgal into the Promised Land while carrying the Ark of the Covenant. It was thus the first documented "mass Aliyah." On that day, God commanded the Israelites to commemorate and celebrate the occasion by erecting twelve stones with the text of the Torah engraved upon them. The stones represented the entirety of the Jewish nation's twelve tribes and their gratitude for God's gift of the Land of Israel (Hebrew: אֶרֶץ יִשְׂרָאֵל, Modern: Eretz Yisrael, Tiberian: ʼÉreṣ Yiśrāʼēl) to them. The 10th of Nisan is also significant as it was the first Shabbat HaGadol that took place five days before the Israelites left Egypt beginning The Exodus. This is also the date that Moses's sister Miriam died and according to the Biblical narrative her well that miraculously traveled with the Israelites through the desert dried up (Numbers 20:1–2).

The tenth of the Hebrew month of Nisan, which is the first month according to the ordering of the Hebrew calendar, is referenced in association with Aliyah multiple times within the Biblical text.

=== Jewish people ===
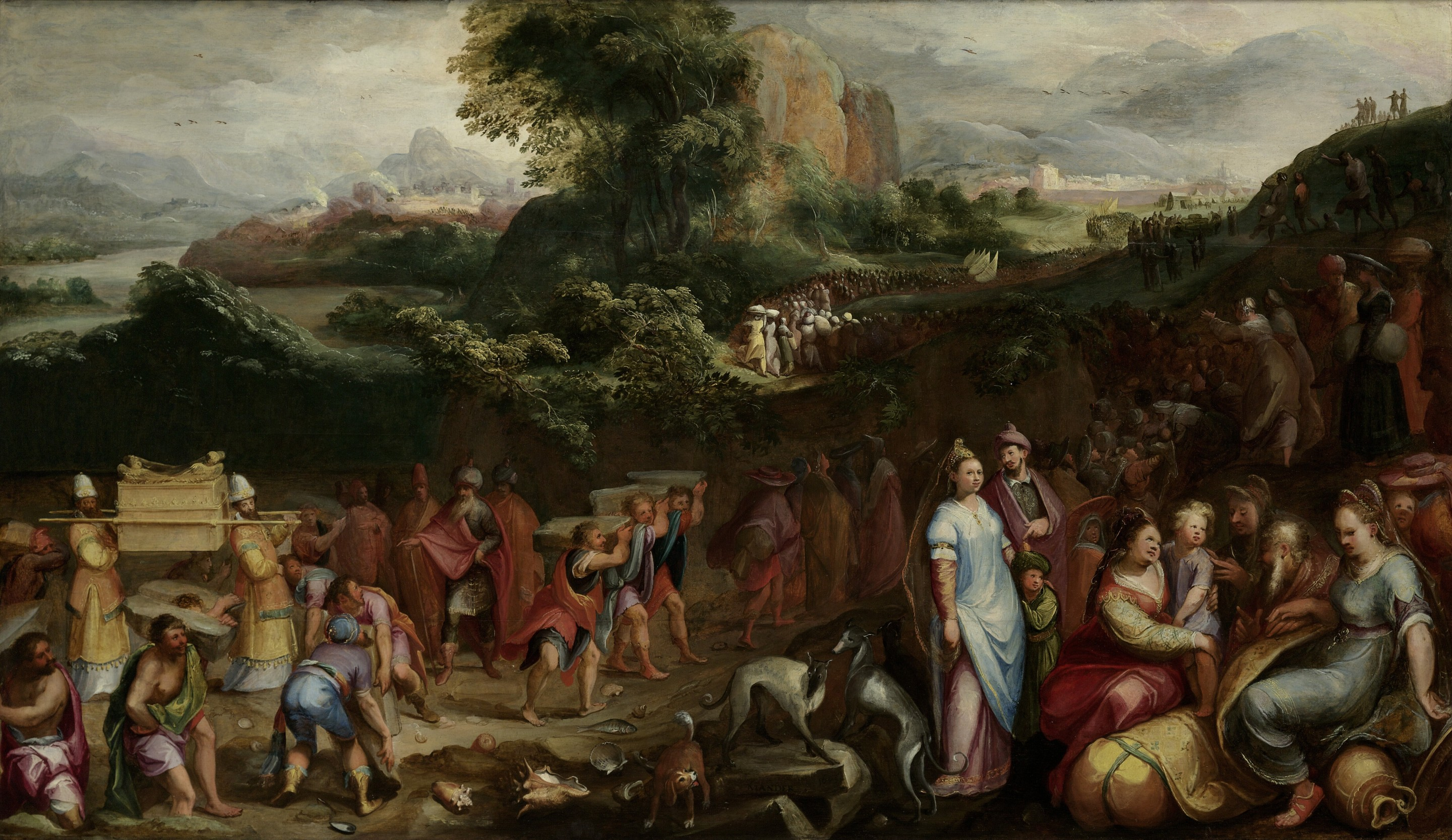
The Jewish People's Passage Across the Jordan River - Karel van Mander - Museum Boijmans Van Beuningen

Entering the Land of Israel en masse has been significant for the Jewish people both historically and in modern times. Besides the individual religious implication of those Torah laws that can only be followed in Israel as opposed to when Jews are living around the world, there are traditional precepts that uniquely effect the Jewish people as an entire nation after having made Aliyah.

For you are crossing the Jordan, to come to possess the Land which the Lord, your God, is giving you, and you shall possess it and dwell in it. And you shall keep to perform all the statutes and ordinances that I am setting before you today.

— Deuteronomy 11:31–32

When the Israelites crossed the Jordan River into the Land of Israel for the first time on the 10th of Nisan, according to traditional Jewish teachings they took upon themselves a special dimension to the concept of "arevut" or "mutual responsibility". Arevut is known also by the Talmudic Hebrew/Aramaic maxim mentioned in Shevuot 39a, "Kol Yisrael Areivim Zeh baZeh", "כל ישראל ערבים זה בזה", meaning "All Jews are Responsible for One Another". The Maharal of Prague, Rabbi Judah Loew ben Bezalel, comments on the Talmudic statement that the Israelites were not truly responsible for one another until after they had crossed the Jordan. Arevut implies an obligation on all Jews to ensure that other Jews have their spiritual and basic needs taken care of. Simply by virtue of being a Jew living in the Land of Israel, one has an elevated responsibility for the well-being of other Jews. Jews are expected to be a “light unto the nations”, presenting a model of morality and brotherly responsibility. Specifically in terms of "Kol Yisrael", the hope is that other nations around the globe will also see how Jews help each other when living in Israel and will try to do the same for their own people.

=== Religious ===
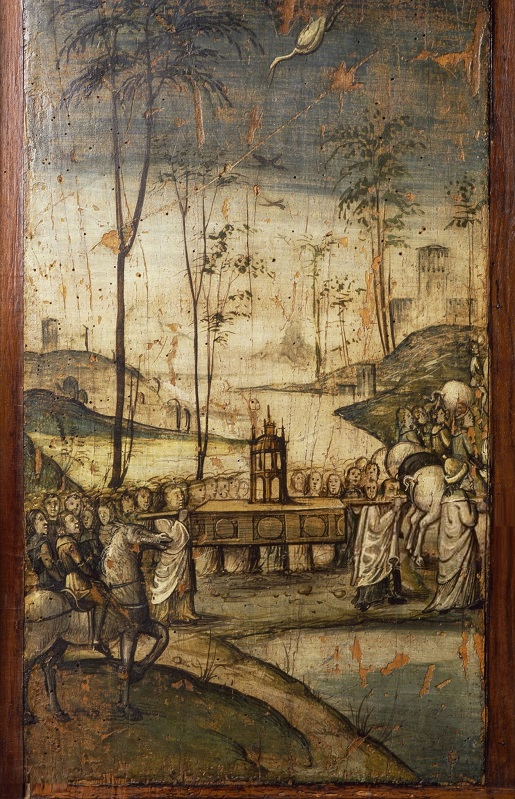
The Israelites crossing the Jordan River with the Ark, Old Sacristy, Milan Italy, 15th c.

According to Jewish religious tradition, upon making Aliyah by crossing the Jordan River to enter the Land of Israel, Joshua composed the Aleinu prayer thanking God. This idea was first cited in the Kol Bo of the late 14th Century.

Several medieval commentators noticed that Joshua’s shorter birth name, Hosea, appears in the first few verses of Aleinu in reverse acrostic: ע – עלינו, ש – שלא שם, ו – ואנחנו כורעים, ה – הוא אלוקינו. The Teshuvot HaGeonim, a Geonic responsum, discussed that Joshua composed the Aleinu because although the Israelites had made Aliyah to the Promised Land, they were surrounded by other peoples, and he wanted the Jews to draw a clear distinction between themselves, who knew and accepted the sovereignty of God, and those nations of the world which did not. In the modern era, religious Jews still pray the Aliyah inspired Aleinu three times daily, including on the High Holidays. The Aleinu prayer begins:

It is our duty to praise the Master of all, to exalt the Creator of the Universe, who has not made us like the nations of the world and has not placed us like the families of the earth, who has not designed our destiny to be like theirs, nor our lot like that of all their multitude.

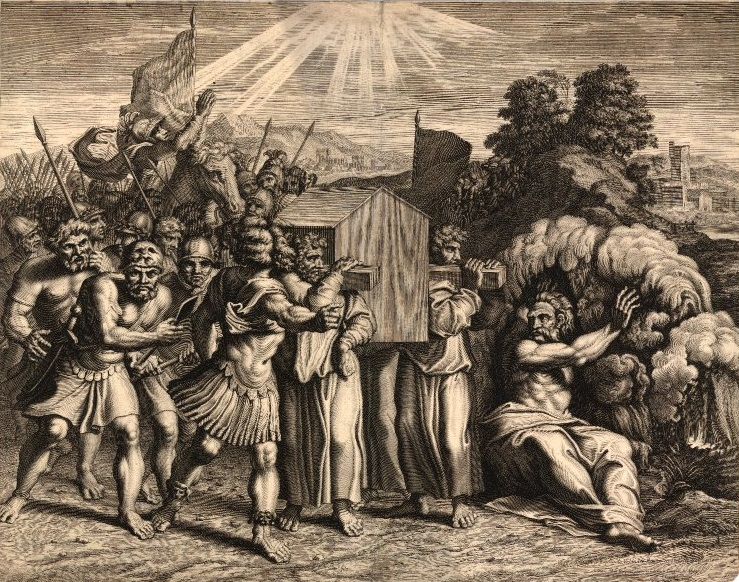
Robert Hecquet, Israelites Crossing the Jordan River

According to the ancient sage rabbis of the Talmud in tractate Berakhot 54a of the Gemara, a Jew must recite a special blessing upon seeing the location of the original Jordan River crossing by the Jewish people, because God performed a great miracle for Israel there.

“Blessed is He Who has performed miracles for our fathers in this place.” - "ברוך שעשה נסים לאבותינו במקום הזה"

In the same chapter, the Talmud elaborates on the details of what it considers the 10th of Nisan miracle.

Granted, the miracles at the crossings of the sea are recorded explicitly in the Torah, as it is stated: 'And the Israelites went into the sea on dry ground and the water was a wall for them on their right and on their left' (Exodus 14:22). So too, the miracle at the crossings of the Jordan, as it is stated: 'The priests who bore the ark of God’s covenant stood on dry land within the Jordan, while all Israel crossed on dry land until the entire nation finished crossing the Jordan'.

=== State of Israel ===
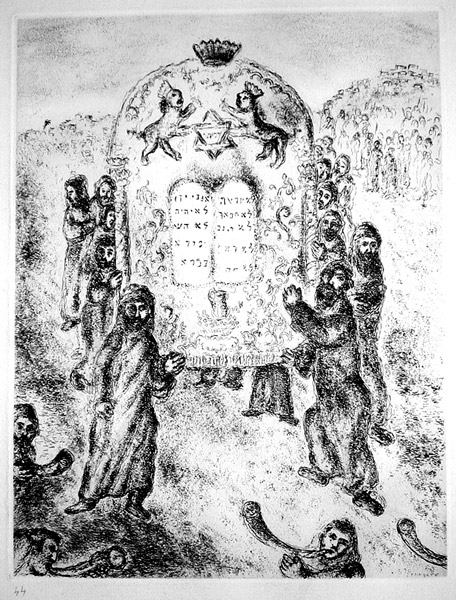
Marc Chagall - Les Israélites Passent le Jourdain

Aliyah (US: /ˌæliˈɑː/, UK: /ˌɑː-/; Hebrew: עֲלִיָּה, "ascent") is the immigration of Jews from the diaspora to the Land of Israel. Also defined as "the act of going up", "making Aliyah" by moving to the Land of Israel is one of the most basic tenets of Judaism and therefore Zionism. The State of Israel's Law of Return gives Jews, and in some cases their descendants, automatic rights regarding residency and Israeli citizenship.

From the modern founding of the State of Israel, honoring Aliyah as a core value of the nation and Israel as the Homeland for the Jewish people is evident even in the text of the Israeli Declaration of Independence, most profoundly in the opening few lines:

The Land of Israel was the birthplace of the Jewish people. Here their spiritual, religious and political identity was shaped. Here they first attained to statehood, created cultural values of national and universal significance and gave to the world the eternal Book of Books. After being forcibly exiled from their Land, the People kept faith with it throughout their dispersion and never ceased to pray and hope for their return to it and for the restoration in it of their political freedom. Impelled by this historic and traditional attachment, Jews strove in every successive generation to re-establish themselves in their ancient homeland. In recent decades they returned in their masses. Pioneers, immigrants, and defenders, they made deserts bloom, revived the Hebrew language, built villages and towns, and created a thriving community controlling its own economy and culture, loving peace but knowing how to defend itself, bringing the blessings of progress to all the country's inhabitants, and aspiring towards independent nationhood. -Israeli Declaration of Independence

Aliyah as a core value of the State of Israel can be seen in its national anthem, Hatikvah, "The Hope", which was adapted from a poem by the 19th century Jewish poet, Naftali Herz Imber.

As long as in the heart, within, A Jewish soul still yearns, And onward, towards the ends of the east, an eye still gazes toward Zion;

Our hope is not yet lost, The hope two thousand years old, To be a free nation in our land, The land of Zion and Jerusalem.

-Hatikvah

Honoring Aliyah has also been at the core of the State of Israel's religious sector. The Prayer for the Welfare of the State of Israel is a prayer said in many Jewish synagogues on Shabbat and on Jewish holidays, both in Israel and around the globe. The prayer requests divine providence for the State of Israel, its leaders, and that God helps with Aliyah, namely that still exiled Jewish People be gathered back into the Land of Israel.

...Remember our brethren, the whole house of Israel, in all the lands of their dispersion. Speedily bring them to Zion your city, to Jerusalem, dwelling of your name, as it is written in the Torah of your servant Moses: ‘Even if your exiles are at the end of the heavens, the Lord, your God, will gather you from there, and He will take you from there. And the Lord, your God, will bring you to the land which your forefathers possessed, and you too will take possession of it, and He will do good to you, and He will make you more numerous than your forefathers.’ -Prayer for the Welfare of the State of Israel

The prayer was instituted in 1948 by the Sephardic and Ashkenazic Chief Rabbis of the newly formed State of Israel, respectively Rabbi Ben-Zion Meir Hai Uziel and Rabbi Yitzhak HaLevi Herzog with assistance by Nobel laureate Shmuel Yosef Agnon.

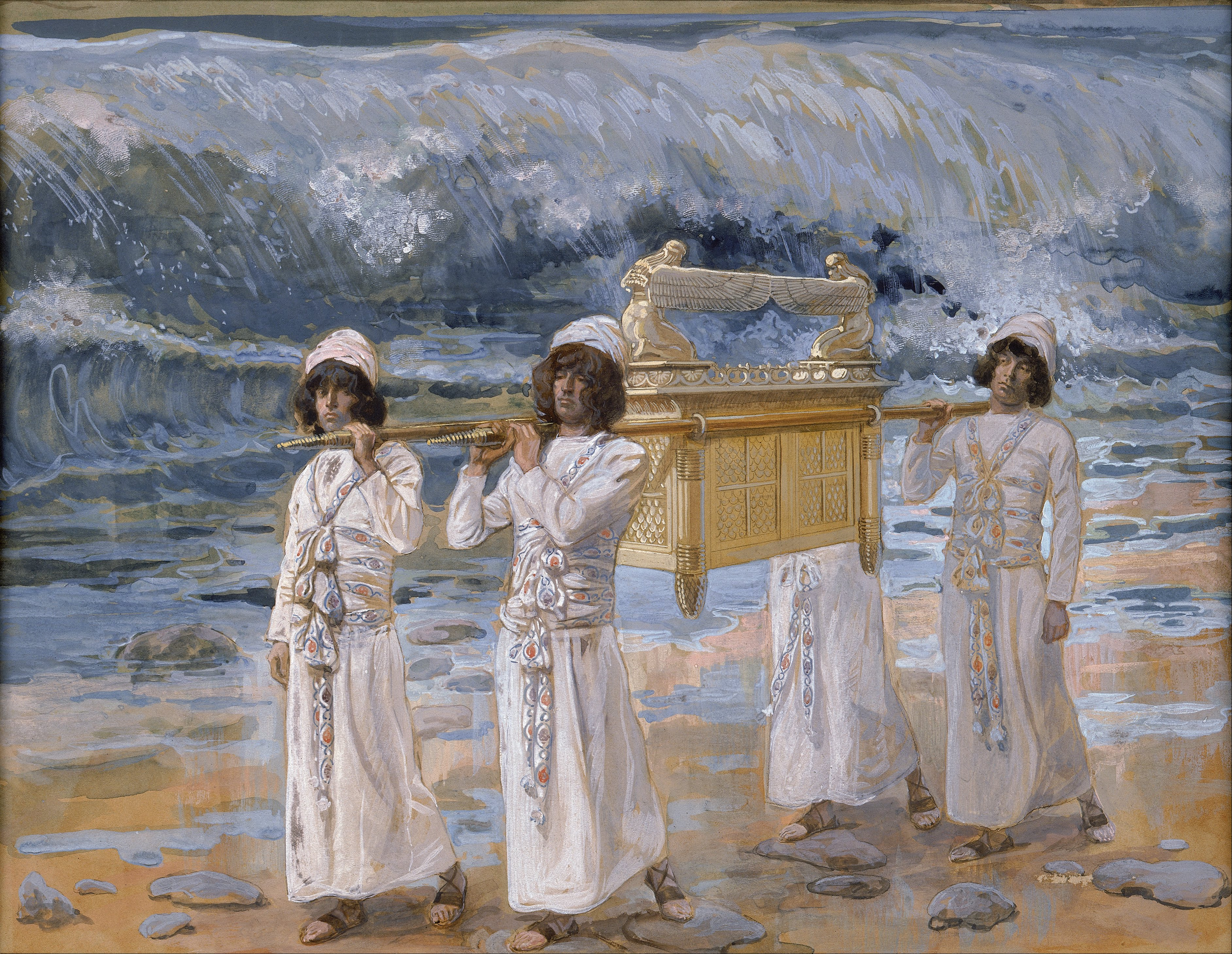
James Jacques Joseph Tissot - The Ark carried by the Israelites over the Jordan River into the Land of Israel on the 10th of Nisan

=== Jewish thought ===
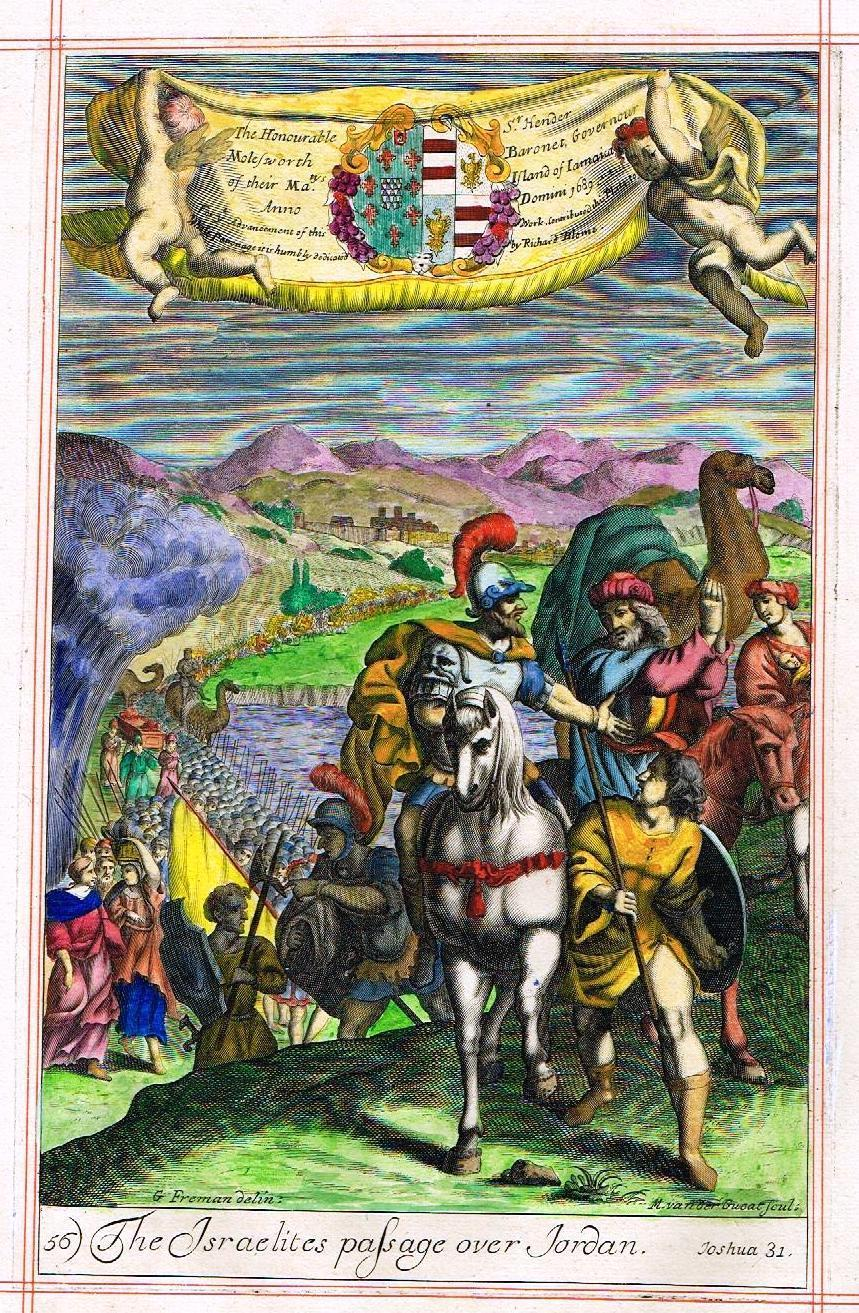
The Ark carried by the Israelites over the Jordan River into the Land of Israel on the 10th of Nisan

Aliyah is an important Jewish religious concept and a fundamental component of Zionism. For much of Jewish history, the majority of the Jewish People have lived in the diaspora where Aliyah was developed as a national aspiration for the Jewish People. It is enshrined in Israel's Law of Return, which accords any Jew (deemed as such by halakha and Israeli secular law) the legal right to assisted immigration and settlement in Israel, as well as Israeli citizenship.

Someone who "makes Aliyah" is called an "Oleh" (m.; pl. "Olim") or "Olah" (f.; pl. "Olot"). Many religious Jews espouse Aliyah as a return to the Promised Land, and regard it as the fulfillment of God's biblical promise to the descendants of the Hebrew patriarchs Abraham, Isaac, and Jacob. Rabbi Moshe Ben Nachman, also known as Nachmanides or the Ramban, includes making Aliyah in his enumeration of the 613 commandments.

The Hebrew Bible is laden with references to a future when the Jewish People would have a mass return to the Land of Israel. The Bible recounts that when God sent the Jews to exile from the Holy Land approximately 2,500 years ago, He made a promise about the future of Aliyah:

And it shall come to pass that on that day, the Lord shall continue to apply His hand a second time to acquire the rest of His people, that will remain from Assyria and from Egypt and from Pathros and from Cush and from Elam and from Sumeria and from Hamath and from the islands of the sea. -Isaiah 11:11

God promised that one day, He would gather His children from the four corners of the earth, and bring them back home, to the Land of Israel:

And He shall raise a banner to the nations, and He shall gather the lost of Israel, and the scattered ones of Judah He shall gather from the four corners of the earth. -Isaiah 11:12

And the redeemed of the Lord shall return, and they shall come to Zion with song, and with everlasting joy on their heads; gladness and joy shall overtake them; sorrow and sighing shall flee. -Isaiah 51:11

Fear not for I am with you; from the east I will bring your seed, and from the west I will gather you. I will say to the north, "Give," and to the south, "Do not refrain"; bring My sons from afar and My daughters from the end of the earth. -Isaiah 43:5-6

In the Talmud, at the end of tractate Ketubot, the Mishnah says:

A man may compel his entire household to go up with him to the Land of Israel, but may not compel one to leave.

The discussion on this passage in the Mishnah emphasizes the importance of living in Israel:

One should always live in the Land of Israel, even in a town where the majority of inhabitants are idolaters, but let no one live outside the Land, even in a town most of whose inhabitants are Israelites; for whoever lives in the Land of Israel may be considered to have a God, but whoever lives outside the Land may be regarded as one who has no God.

Sifre says that the mitzvah (commandment) of living in Eretz Yisrael is as important as all the other mitzvot combined. There are many mitzvot such as shmita, the sabbatical year for farming, which can only be fulfilled in the Land of Israel.

According to the traditional Jewish ordering of books of the Tanakh (Old Testament), the very last word of the last book in the original Hebrew (2 Chronicles 36:23) is v^{e}ya‘al, a jussive verb form derived from the same root as "Aliyah", meaning "and let him go up" (to Jerusalem in the Land of Israel).

As the tenth of Nisan occurs a few days before the Passover holiday, when Israeli schools are not in session, the school system will also honor Aliyah on the seventh of the Hebrew month of Cheshvan. That date is also symbolic as the Torah portion read in synagogues that week, Lekh Lekha, relates the story of how the biblical patriarch Abraham is ordered by God to leave his home, his birthplace, and his family and go up to the Land of Israel. This is also the date that the additional prayer for rain is added into the Amidah, and recited three times a day by Jews in Israel.

=== Modern ===
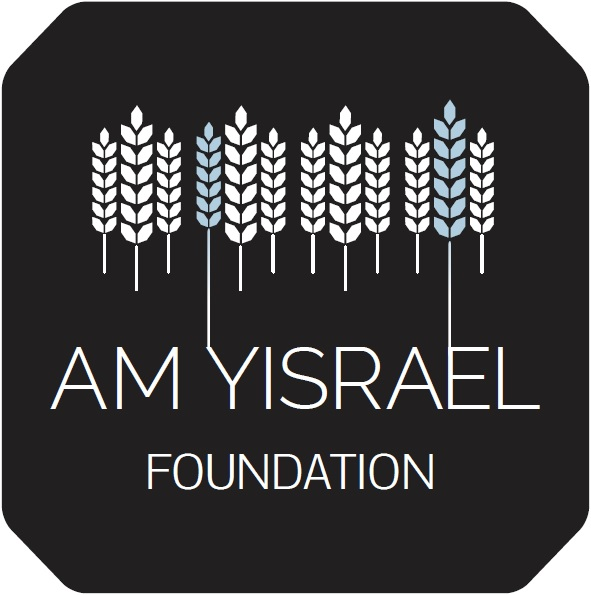
Am Yisrael Foundation logo representing the Twelve Tribes of Israel having made Aliyah to the Land of Israel en masse from the now emptied out four corners of the world, signified as the twelve stalks of wheat dreamt by Joseph

Jay M. Shultz, President of the Am Yisrael Foundation, the initiator and driving force behind the creation of the Israeli national holiday Yom HaAliyah, believes that the holiday will enable Jews...

to connect the Biblical historical truth of Joshua crossing the Jordan to our modern practical reality... especially when Jews worldwide are celebrating Passover, and remembering the Exodus, they should take to heart that the final destination of leaving Egypt was entering the Land of Israel. The oft repeated phrase 'L'Shana Haba'ah B'Yerushalayim - Next Year in Jerusalem' should not be said in vain. There has never been an easier time in history for a Jew to live in Israel. It is time for every Jew to come Home.

Although it was not a reoccurring holiday, the first instance of a modern public celebration honoring an 'Aliyah Day' about Jewish immigrants settling the Land of Israel was hosted by Keren HaYesod in Tel Aviv on the second of November 1950.

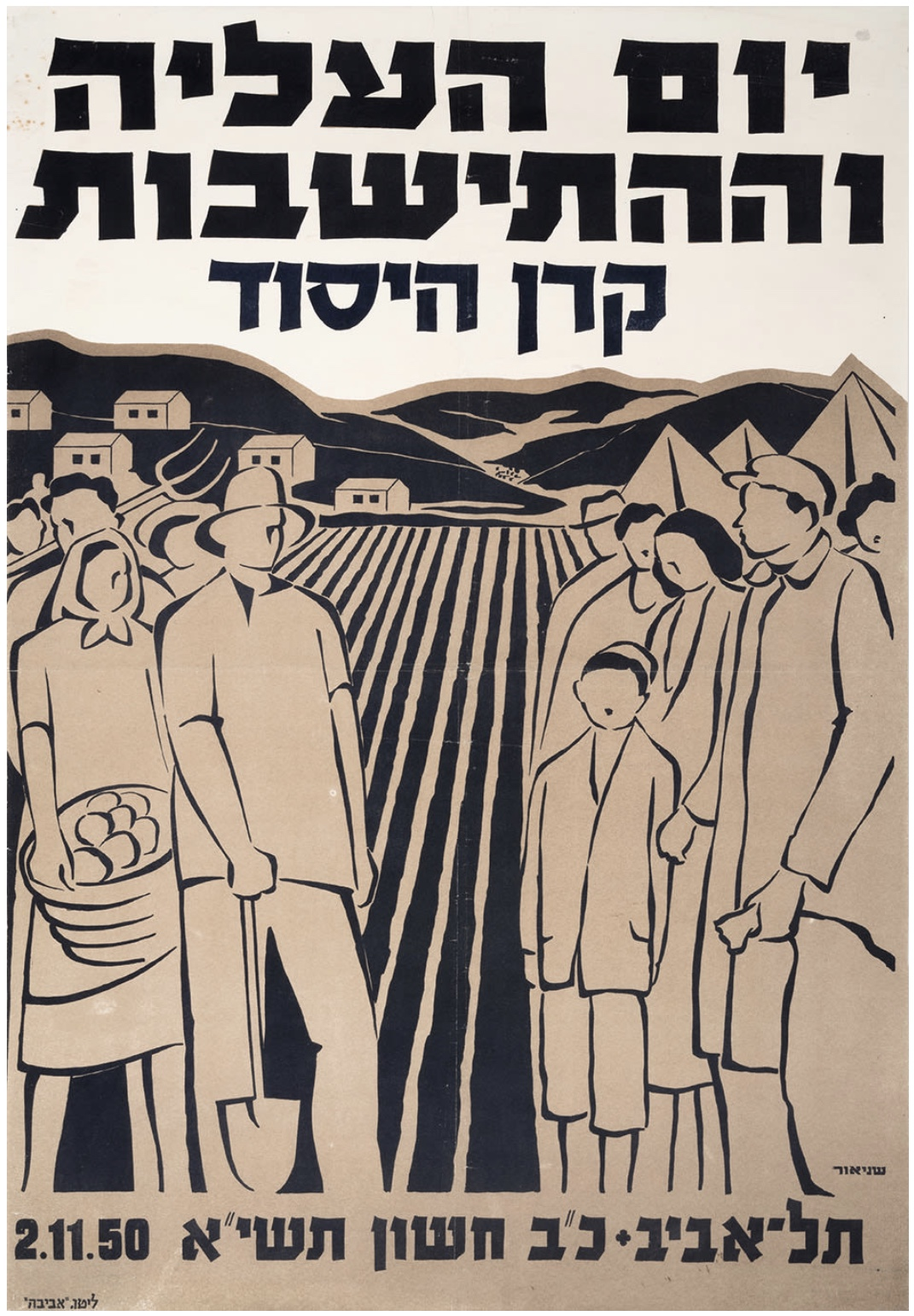
Israeli poster celebrating Yom HaAliyah (Aliyah Day) from the Yosef Matisyahu Collection

The first modern public Israeli celebration of Aliyah was instituted in 1948 by Israel's first Prime Minister David Ben-Gurion, named "Yom Kibbutz Galuyot", “ יום קיבוץ גלויות” or "In-gathering of the Exiles Day".

== See also ==
- Public holidays in Israel
- Culture of Israel
- Jewish holidays
- Gathering of Israel
- Atchalta De'Geulah
- Return to Zion
- Jewish diaspora
- Homeland for the Jewish people
- Pre-Modern Aliyah
- Proto-Zionism
- L'Shana Haba'ah B'Yerushalayim
- Law of Return
- Israeli Nationality Law of 1952
- Hebrew calendar
- List of observances set by the Hebrew calendar
- Holy Land
- History of the Jews and Judaism in the Land of Israel
- History of Zionism
- Expulsions and exoduses of Jews
- Jewish exodus from Arab and Muslim countries
- Israeli passport
- Negation of the Diaspora
