= L'Shana Haba'ah =

Jewish prayer

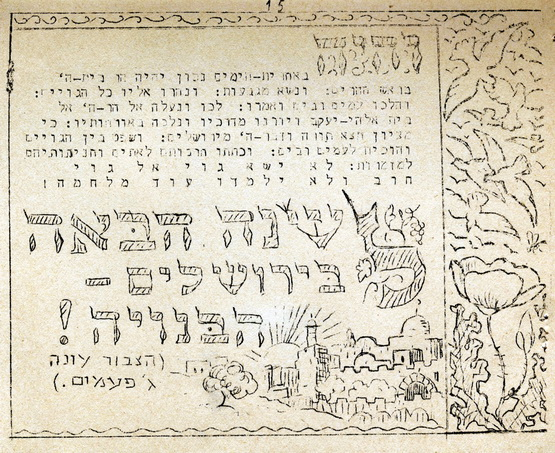
"Next year in rebuilt Jerusalem": Passover Haggadah printed on stencil paper, published by the Jewish Brigade, Naples, 1945.

L'Shana Haba'ah B'Yerushalayim (Hebrew: לְשָׁנָה הַבָּאָה בִּירוּשָלָיִם, lit. 'Next year in Jerusalem'), is a phrase that is often sung at the end of the Passover Seder and—in the Eastern Ashkenazic rite—at the end of the Ne'ila service on Yom Kippur. The phrase was commonly used in the 12th century. Its use during Passover was first recorded in the 13th century Birds' Head Haggadah. Isaac Tyrnau in his 15th century CE book catalogued its use as the accepted tradition (minhag) of various Ashkenazi communities.

L'Shana Haba'ah evokes common themes in Jewish culture; a love of Jerusalem and a desire to return to a rebuilt Jerusalem; commentators have suggested that it serves as a reminder of the experience of living in exile.

== Background ==
After the destruction of the Temple in Jerusalem, the hope of seeing it rebuilt became a central component of Jewish religious consciousness and the most common way religious Jews have expressed hope for future redemption. The Talmud is replete with statements affirming the superior religious status of the Holy Land, the obligation of Jews to live there, and the confidence in the ultimate collective return of the Jewish people.

Jewish belief posits that although the Temple in Jerusalem was destroyed twice, it will be rebuilt a third time, ushering in the Messianic era and the ingathering of the exiles. Supplications for the temple and Jerusalem are often mentioned at Jewish ritual contexts, particularly those connected to yearly events or lifecycles, reflected in the recitation of the phrase L'Shana Haba'ah B'Yerushalayim ("Next year in Jerusalem").

== Usage ==
A 1948 Seder plate made by Holocaust survivors in a Bavarian displaced persons camp alters the traditional phrase to "This year in Jerusalem", expressing the urgent desire to immigrate to the Land of Israel.

The Passover Seder concludes with L'Shana Haba'ah B'Yerushalayim ("Next Year in Jerusalem!"). In the Eastern Ashekanzic rite, the fifth and final prayer service of Yom Kippur, Ne'ila, concludes with the blowing of a shofar and the recitation of L'Shana Haba'ah B'Yerushalayim.

In Israel, Jews often add an additional word to the phrase: L'Shana Haba'ah B'Yerushalayim habnuyah ("Next year in the rebuilt Jerusalem").

An inversion of the phrase ("בירושלים לשנה הבאה", lit. '"In Jerusalem, to the next year') is seen in Joseph Ibn Abitur's 10th century poem "A'amir Mistatter", which is found in the Cairo Geniza and appears in many Eastern Ashkenazic Machzorim as a prayer for the Shabbat before Passover. Isaac ibn Ghiyyat's poem "Yedidekha me-Emesh" contains the phrase in its more common wording ("לשנה הבאה בירושלים").

Isaac Tyrnau in the 15th century CE was the first to write of recitation of the phrase during Passover. The phrase is not found in works such as the Tanakh, the Talmud or any of the Haggadot of the Rishonim period such as Rashi and Rabbeinu Tam, but does appear in the 13th century Birds' Head Haggadah.

== Symbolism ==
Rabbi Jonathan Sacks, who served as Chief Rabbi of the United Hebrew Congregations of the Commonwealth from 1991 to 2013, cited the recitation of the song at the conclusion of the Passover and Yom Kippur liturgy as a sign of the abiding Jewish connection to Jerusalem. Lesli Koppelman Ross has suggested that the recitation L'Shana Haba'ah serves as a reminder of the personal experience of exile that "we need to reconcile in order to truly be in Jerusalem, a city whose name suggests peace (shalom) and completeness (shaleim)". Professor Nancy Berg of Washington University in St. Louis has also suggested that the recitation of L'Shana Haba'ah "unite[s] the Jews as a people" because it is a reminder of the shared experience of living in exile,. Some scholars have noted that the purpose of reciting L'Shana Haba'ah at the end of the Ne'ila prayers on Yom Kippur is to express "our deep felt yearning to reunite with the Shechinah in the rebuilt Yerushalayim". Rabbi Wayne Dosick has also suggested that L'Shana Haba'ah is both a prayer "for an end to exile and return to the Land of Israel" as well as "a prayer for ultimate redemption, for peace and perfection for the entire world".

== See also ==
- Jerusalem in Judaism
- Passover songs
- Yom HaAliyah
