= Yishai Fleisher =

Israeli spokesman

- ישי פליישר
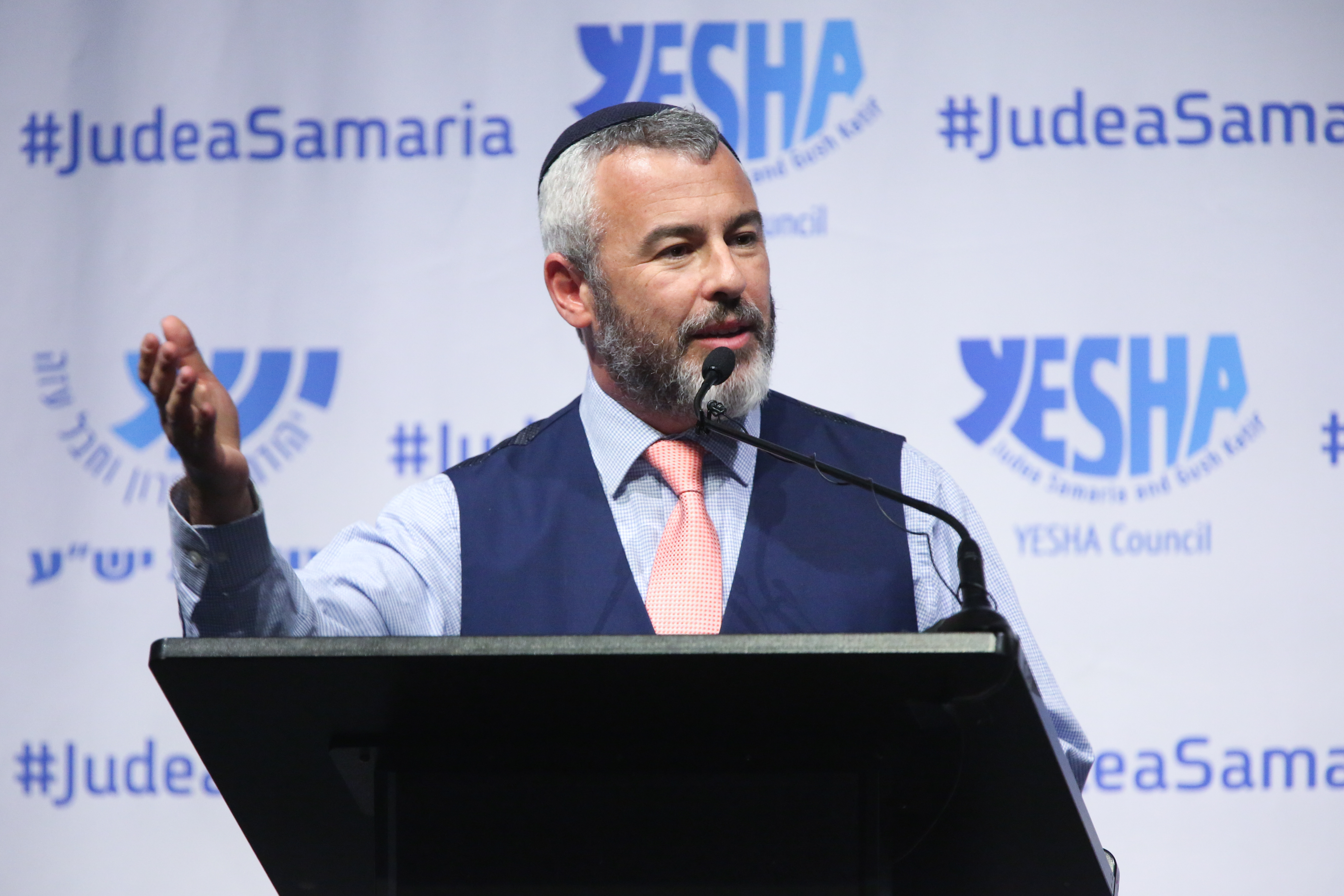
- Yishai Fleisher speaking in Washington DC, 2019.
- Born: 1976 (age 49–50); Haifa, Israel
- Education: Yeshiva University
- Occupations: Spokesperson, podcaster, writer
- Website: www.yishaifleisher.com

Yishai Fleisher (Hebrew: ישי פליישר; born 1976) serves as the international spokesperson for the Jewish Community of Hebron. He is a podcast host, pro-Israel advocate and political advisor. Fleisher speaks English, Hebrew and Russian and has been described as "a go-to Israel expert for international media."

== Early life ==
Yishai Fleisher was born in 1976 in Haifa, Israel, to Jewish refuseniks from the Soviet Union. The family emigrated to the US when he was eight. Fleisher returned to Israel and served as a paratrooper in the Israel Defense Forces and was injured in Lebanon during his military service in 1997.

Fleisher returned to the US where he completed an undergraduate degree in political science at Yeshiva University, then a Juris Doctor at the Cardozo School of Law of Yeshiva University. He received his rabbinic ordination from Kollel Agudath Achim.

== Early career ==
=== Advocacy for Aliyah ===
While in law school in 1999, Fleisher co-founded the organization Kumah which advocates for aliyah and encourages Jewish students to move to Israel. The group's tag line was "Arise! Americans Return to Zion" and took its name from a verse in the Book of Jeremiah. The group engaged in seminars, weekend retreats, birthright trips and created unique and creative posters and videos.

== Broadcasting career ==
After graduating, Fleisher was recruited to Arutz Sheva – Israel National Radio / Israel National News in 2003 and became Director of Programming for the English department. He co-hosted the Aliyah Show and the Yishai Fleisher Show, frequently doing live remote broadcasts and special events. During his seven years at the station, he grew the department during the early days of podcasts and mp3 downloads, organized tours and seminars and interviewed top name Israeli and international celebrities, politicians and newsmakers.

He co-created Free Your Mind: The Aliyah Revolution, an animated short film based on The Matrix promoting aliyah to American Jews and produced The Aliyah Revolution, a compilation album of popular modern Jewish-Israeli musicians.

In 2011, Fleisher continued his broadcasting at Galey Yisrael Radio which at the time was the only English language talk show on broadcast Israeli radio. From 2014 – 2015 was Director of Programming at the popular but short-lived Voice of Israel Jerusalem-based broadcast network.

His Yishai Fleisher Show continues on The Land of Israel Network and on his personal website, YishaiFleisher.com. He regularly hosts live streaming videos and discusses news, politics, and Torah combine with interviews.

== Political career and advocacy work ==
Fleisher proposed Aliyah Day, to celebrate Jewish immigration to Israel in 2008, based on concepts developed from the Kumah NGO. He wrote the bill and presented it to the Knesset in 2010. The bill was shelfed and eventually taken up by the Am Yisrael Foundation who lobbied Knesset to pass the bill in 2016.

=== Jewish Community of Hebron ===
In 2015, Fleisher became the international spokesperson for the Jewish Community of Hebron, the city where he was married. In this capacity, he tours VIPs such as former U.S. vice-president Mike Pence, conducts interviews with foreign media, fund raises, and goes on speaking tours. He has also met with representatives of Arab community of Hebron in order to foster Arab-Jewish relations. In 2016, Fleisher argued against UNESCO's attempt to recognize the Tomb of the Patriarchs in Hebron as a Palestinian World Heritage Site. He also helps promote large scale events in Hebron such as the Shabbat Chayei Sarah, and music concerts on Passover and Sukkot and explaining the historical significance of the city.

He was instrumental in restoring the area of the Tomb of Jesse and Ruth in Hebron, dating back even before his official capacity as spokesperson.

In 2023 he unveiled plans for turned Route 60, which runs past Hebron, into the Biblical Highway developed during a tour with former U.S. ambassador to Israel David Friedman and former Secretary of State Mike Pompeo. The highway, which passes through sites mentioned during Abraham’s travels in the Bible, would become an attraction that would highlight the historical aspects of the route.

In 2023 he was awarded the Ari Fuld Lion of Zion Prize.

=== Political advisor ===
In 2022, Itamar Ben-Gvir, a resident of Hebron and leader of the Otzma Yehudit party, utilized Fleisher’s services as a political advisor and translator during the 2022 Israeli elections. After Ben-Gvir was elected and appointed Minister of National Security, the relationship continued and Fleisher accompanied him during speeches where fluent English was necessary and served as a media liaison for BBC, and other international media outlets. He joined Ben-Gvir in 2025 during his speaking tour in the United States.

=== Knesset career ===
In 2006 he ran for Knesset with the Atid Ehad party led by Dr. Avraham Neguisse, an activist for Ethiopian Israelis, and Yechezkel Stelzer, an Argentinian-born rabbi. The party advocated support for new immigrants.

In September 2026 he was placed on the Otzma Yehudit party list as a candidate for the 2026 Israeli legislative election.

=== Municipal career ===
In 2024 he was a candidate for Efrat municipal council and was elected as a member of the Efrat On the Move party led by Avital Cohen.

=== New York Times controversy ===
In 2017 Fleisher penned an article in The New York Times titled A Settler’s View of Israel’s Future which outlined five alternatives to the Two-State Solution of the Arab-Israeli conflict. The article generated controversy among the newspaper’s editorial staff some of whom "thought it crossed the line into 'hate speech' or 'denying personhood to the Palestinians.'" New York Times Opinion Editor James Bennet was quoted as saying, "we had a big argument over a piece by a settler... Was it an act of, kind of, hate speech in a sense? I felt strongly that we should publish the piece and we did, as did others. Because this particular viewpoint is hugely consequential.”

Fleisher has appeared on Piers Morgan, CNN, BBC, Al Jazeera English, and Fox News.

== Biblical Highway initiative ==
Fleisher has been involved in efforts to promote the branding of Israel’s Highway 60 as “The Biblical Highway,” a heritage and tourism route linking sites associated with biblical narratives and Jewish history. The idea was promoted by Fleisher and other activists as a way to present the road as a continuous historical corridor from Beersheba through Jerusalem and the central hill country to northern Israel. In 2026, the Israeli government advanced the initiative as a tourism and public diplomacy project, with plans for signage, visitor infrastructure and educational programming along the route. Supporters of the project have compared the concept to other heritage routes, including Route 66 in the United States.
