= Jeffrey Yishai =

Israeli footballer

Jeffrey Yishai ג'פרי ישי
Personal information
- Full name: Jeffrey Yishai
- Date of birth: 10 January 1978 (age 48)
- Place of birth: Israel
- Position: Center back

Youth career
- Maccabi Tel Aviv

Senior career*
Years	Team	Apps	(Gls)
1997–2000	Maccabi Tel Aviv	17	(0)
2000–2001	Maccabi Netanya	0	(0)
2001–2003	Bnei Yehuda	59	(2)
- * Club domestic league appearances and goals

Jeffrey Yishai (Hebrew: ג'פרי ישי) is a former Israeli footballer.
