= Zvi Wiener =

Israeli educator

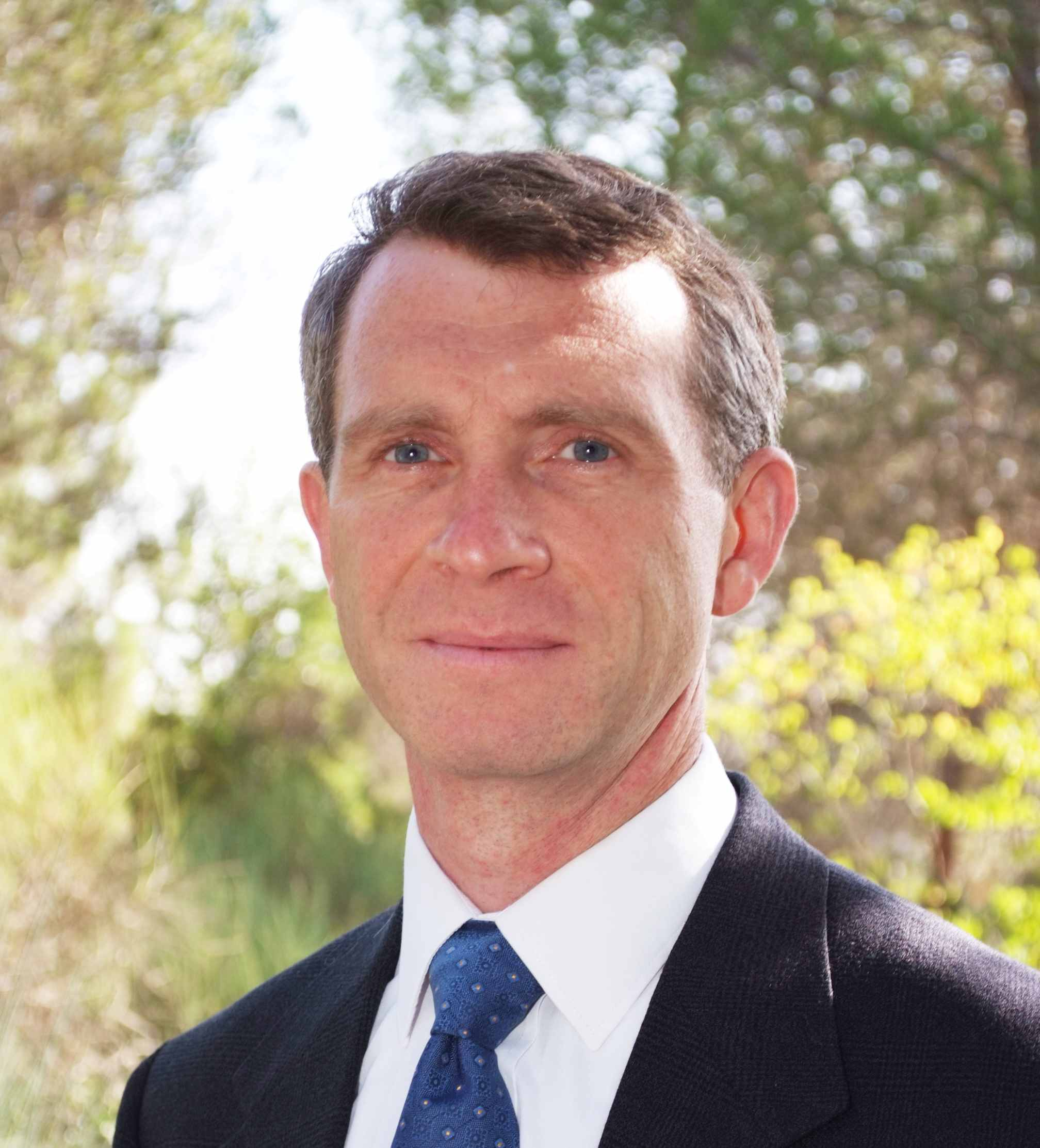
Professor Zvi Wiener

Zvi Wiener (Hebrew: צבי וינר) is a Professor of Finance and the former dean of the Hebrew University Business School Business administration at the Hebrew University of Jerusalem.

== Biography ==
Wiener has Ph.D. in mathematics from the Weizmann Institute of Science in Rehovot (1994). He completed postdoc at the Wharton Business School of the University of Pennsylvania and then joined the Fixed Income division of Lehman Brothers in New York City. Since 1996 Wiener joined the Hebrew University faculty.

Wiener is the former Head of the Finance Department and the academic manager of the Executive MBA program specializing in Finance and Banking at the Hebrew University.

Wiener is one of the founders of the Professional Risk Managers' International Association (PRMIA) and serves as a director of PRMIA in Israel. He also served as a consultant for many institutions like Pension funds, Ministry of Finance, the Bank of Israel, Israel Securities Authority and the Tel Aviv Stock Exchange. Wiener also served at the Bank of Israel foreign reserves investment committee.

Wiener provides lobbying services to Bank Hapoalim, and also holds a private company, named Optimize Risk Management Ltd. According to an investigation by The Marker magazine, Wiener's private activities violate the directives of the Supervisor of Wages and Labor Agreements since he serves at the same time as Dean at the Hebrew University and founded by the Israeli government. According to Wiener these activities are in line with regulations. However, the Council for Higher Education did not confirm his claim and instruct the Hebrew University to examine Wiener's employment exception. The Enforcement Branch at the Office of the Supervisor of Wages and Labor Agreements also initiated an examination of that exception. It was also reported that Wiener has promoted a private entrepreneur's appointment at the Hebrew University immediately before the last contributed a large amount of money to the School of Business Administration at the Hebrew University.

Wiener won the Rothschild Fellowship for young scholars of outstanding academic merit and the Alon fellowship for young excellent Scientists. He also won the Teva prize named after Dan Suesskind for research on Dividend policy.

== Research ==
His areas of expertise are Financial modeling, Risk Management, Options and other derivatives with Applications to Corporate finance, Structured product, Stochastic process, Monte Carlo Simulation and Game theory.

- Bergman, Yaacov Z.; Grundy, Bruce D.; Wiener, Zvi (December 1996). "General Properties of Option Prices". The Journal of Finance. 51 (5): 1573–1610. doi:10.1111/j.1540-6261.1996.tb05218.x.
- Goldstein, Michael A.; Irvine, Paul; Kandel, Eugene; Wiener, Zvi (December 2009). "Brokerage Commissions and Institutional Trading Patterns". Review of Financial Studies. 22 (12): 5175–5212. doi:10.1093/rfs/hhp083.
- Galai, Dan; Raviv, Alon; Wiener, Zvi (December 2007). "Liquidation triggers and the valuation of equity and debt". Journal of Banking & Finance. 31 (12): 3604–3620. doi:10.1016/j.jbankfin.2007.01.012.
- Benninga, Simon; Björk, Tomas; Wiener, Zvi (30 November 2002). "On the Use of Numeraires in Option Pricing" (PDF). The Journal of Derivatives. 10 (2): 43–58. doi:10.3905/jod.2002.319195.
- Kremer, Ilan; Wiener, Zvi; Winter, Eyal (August 2017). "Flow auctions". International Journal of Game Theory. 46 (3): 655–665. doi:10.1007/s00182-016-0549-3.
- Galai, Dan; Wiener, Zvi (August 2012). "Credit Risk Spreads in Local and Foreign Currencies". Journal of Money, Credit and Banking. 44 (5): 883–901. doi:10.1111/j.1538-4616.2012.00514.x.
- Galai, Dan; Wiener, Zvi (April 2008). "Stakeholders and the composition of the voting rights of the board of directors". Journal of Corporate Finance. 14 (2): 107–117. doi:10.1016/j.jcorpfin.2008.02.005.
- Cserna, Balazs; Levy, Ariel; Wiener, Zvi (30 June 2013). "Counterparty Risk in Exchange-TradedNotes (ETNs)". The Journal of Fixed Income. 23 (1): 76–101. doi:10.3905/jfi.2013.23.1.076.
- Levy, Haim; Wiener, Zvi (July 2013). "Prospect theory and utility theory: Temporary versus permanent attitude toward risk". Journal of Economics and Business. 68: 1–23. doi:10.1016/j.jeconbus.2013.01.002.
- Cvitanić, Jakša; Wiener, Zvi; Zapatero, Fernando (April 2008). "Analytic Pricing of Employee Stock Options". Review of Financial Studies. 21 (2): 683–724. doi:10.1093/rfs/hhm065.
- Leippold, Markus; Wiener, Zvi (December 2004). "Efficient Calibration of Trinomial Trees for One-Factor Short Rate Models" (PDF). Review of Derivatives Research. 7 (3): 213–239. doi:10.1007/s11147-004-4810-8.
- O'Neill, Barry; Samet, Dov; Wiener, Zvi; Winter, Eyal (July 2004). "Bargaining with an agenda". Games and Economic Behavior. 48 (1): 139–153. doi:10.1016/j.geb.2003.07.002.
- Galai, Dan; Wiener, Zvi (2003). "Government Support of Investment Projects in the Private Sector: A Microeconomic Approach". Financial Management. 32 (3): 33–50. JSTOR 3666382. SSRN 453283. Gale A109221315.
- Bergman, Yaacov Z.; Grundy, Bruce D.; Wiener, Zvi (December 1996). "General Properties of Option Prices". The Journal of Finance. 51 (5): 1573–1610. doi:10.1111/j.1540-6261.1996.tb05218.x.
- Benninga, S.Z.; Wiener, Z. (1998). "Binomial term structure models". Mathematica in Education and Research. 3: 11–19.

== Wiener research in articles ==
- Binomial options pricing model
- Ho–Lee model
- Short-rate model
- Black–Karasinski model
- Value at risk
