= Haze'evot =

Israeli rock band

Haze'evot הזאבות
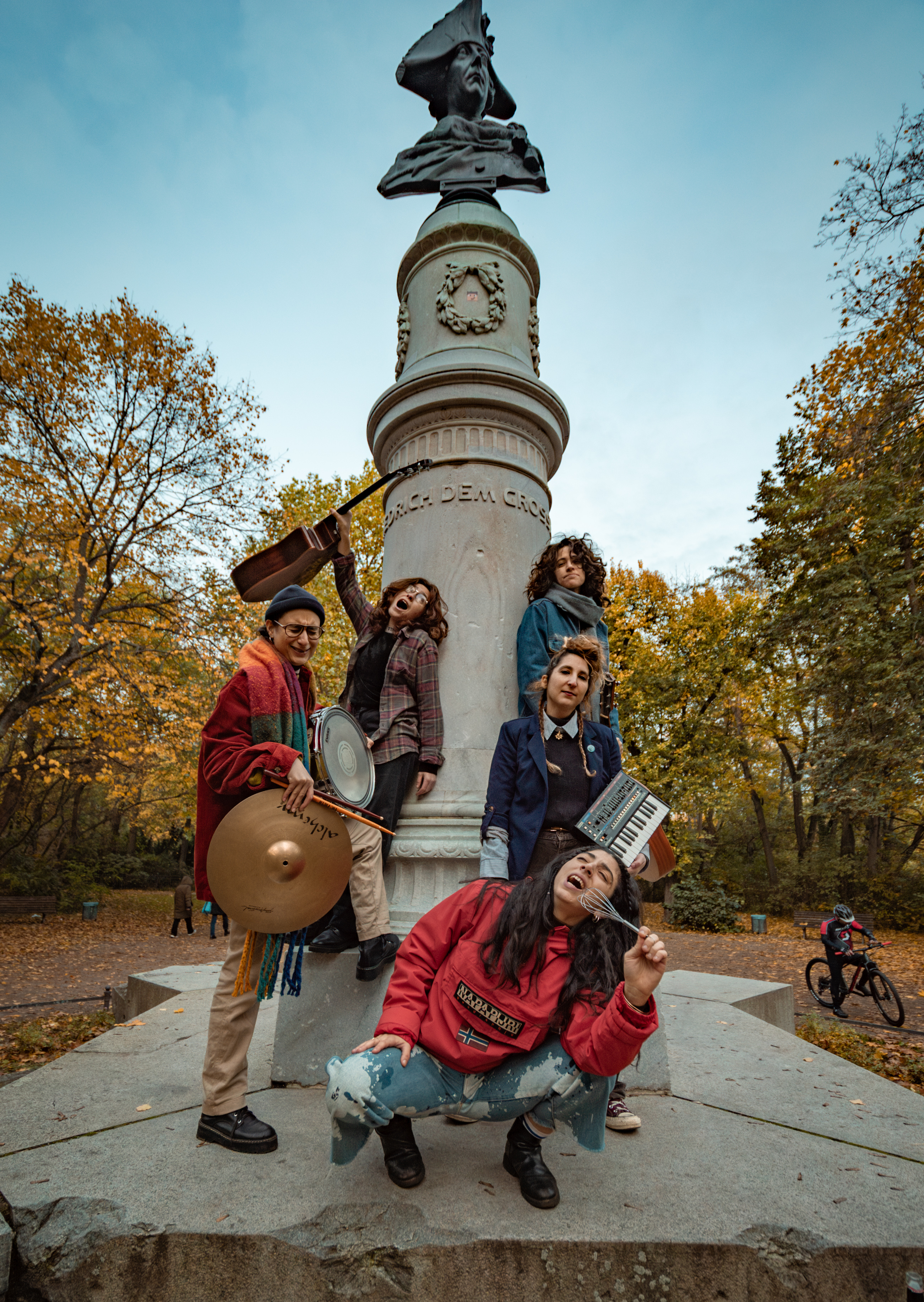
- Pic by Dorel Sivan

Background information
- Origin: Holon, Israel
- Genres: Rock
- Years active: 2012–present
- Members: Yifat Balassiano (vocals & guitar); Or Zigelbaum (guitar); Talia Ishai (bass guitar); Hen Yair (drums); Nofar Tom (synthesiser & guitar)
- Website: www.hazeevot.com

Haze'evot (Hebrew: הזאבות, translation: The She-Wolves) is a rock band and independent female collective based in Israel. The band members are Yifat Balassiano, Talia Ishai, Or Zigelbaum, Hen Yair and Nofar Tom.

The band operates as an independent group, collaboratively producing most of their content while maintaining an authentic spirit and vibrant energy. Haze'evot blends musical styles such as rock, disco, and funk, and plays original material both in Hebrew and English. It has noted Placebo, The Pixies, Radiohead, David Bowie, The Beatles, Sonic Youth, PJ Harvey and Blur as their musical influences.

== History ==
=== 2000s ===
In the 2000s, the four original members of the band met in highschool in the town of Holon, Israel and began to play music together. Their early rehearsals took place at the conservatory in Holon after hours. Among the original lineup, Yifat Balassiano was the founding member who has continued with the band ever since.

=== 2010s ===
In 2012, Haze'evot released its first mini-album under the musical production of Yehu Yaron. In 2015, the band went back to the studio with musical producer Nadav Perser and recorded its second album which was released in May of that year.

Haze'evot toured Israel non-stop and in October 2016 went on their first European tour and performed at the Waves festival in Vienna. Also in 2016, the management at Bar-Ilan University informed the band that they cannot sing during a Holocaust Memorial Day ceremony citing religious reasons. The decision drew attention as the band’s lead singer was, at the time, an undergraduate student at the university.

=== 2020s ===
On January 30, 2021, Haze'evot officially announced the departure of original member Moran Saranga, also known as Moris, and welcomed Or Zigelbaum who replaced her on guitar.

In June 2023 it released their first song from the second album. During July 2023 the band played 11 shows around Germany and the Czech Republic, including the Waldstock festival in Pegnitz, and Colours of Ostrova.

Throughout 2024, the band continued to play in Israel and embarked on four European tours, including at the Fusion Festival in Germany. Alongside their performances, they conducted workshops in schools and community centers, discussing the power of art to transform reality, the role of creativity within communities, and the building of cultural bridges. The workshops emphasized the human ability to influence both the political and spiritual atmosphere and to actively effect change.

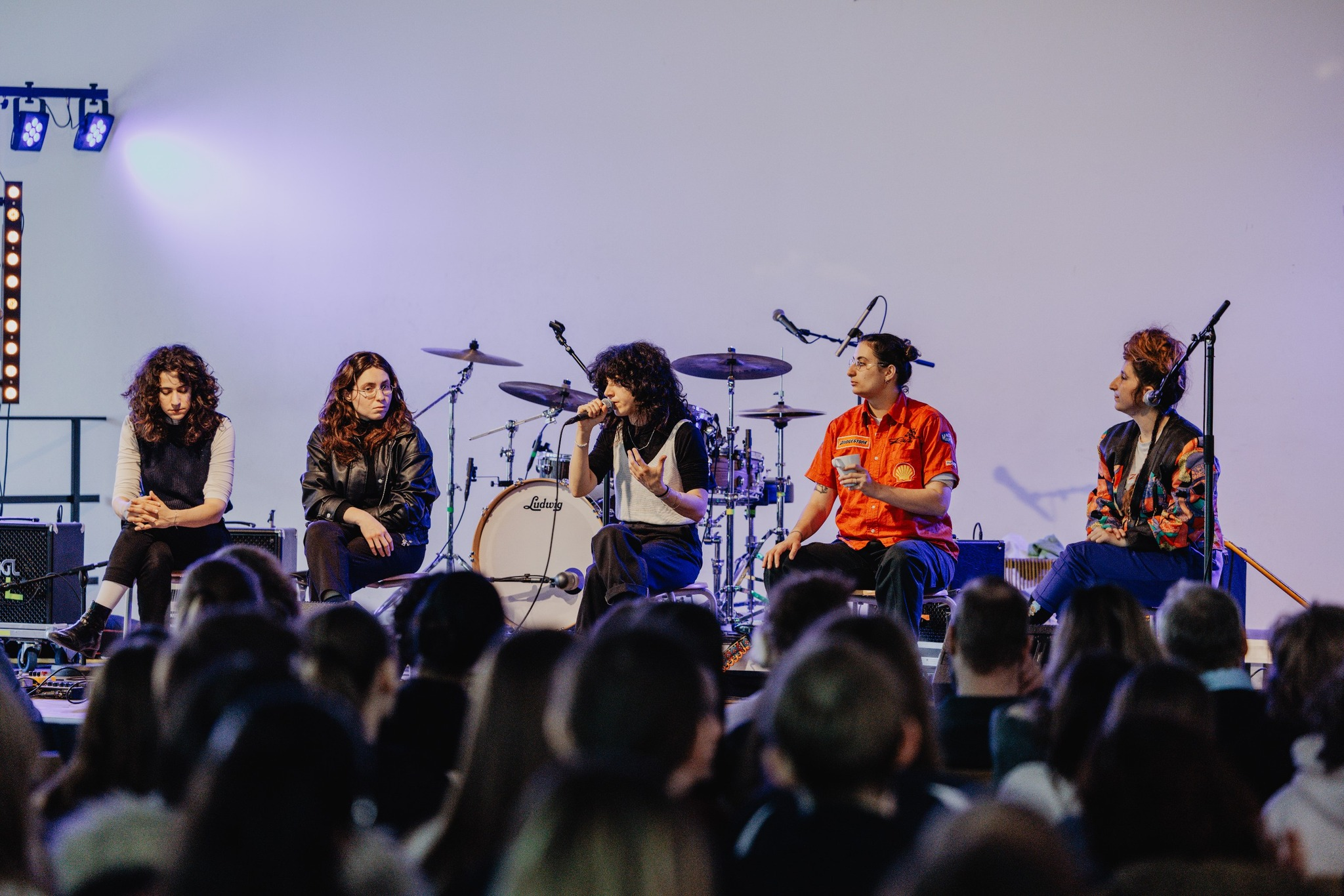
Haze'evot during workshop in Hannover 2025

In February 2025, about a month before the full album’s release, the band released the song "Adama" (Hebrew: אדמה, lit. "Earth"), which was written few dates after October 7 attack , capturing a deep sense of sorrow and fear. The song was accompanied by a music video directed by the band’s lead vocalist, Yifat Balassiano. Balassiano shared that the idea for the video emerged several months before filming, on a night when hundreds of rockets were launched toward Israel. While on her way to take cover, she stopped in front of a barbershop where a man was calmly getting a haircut. The surreal moment sparked powerful inspiration and offered her a unique perspective on life during wartime, and on the fundamental human longing to keep living, to renew, and to look forward with hope. The video features actress Shosha Goren and was filmed in jaffa.

In March 2025, the band released a new album titled ZE MA YESH (Hebrew: זה מה יש, lit. "It is what it is"). The majority of the album was recorded beginning in early October 2024, heavily influenced by the intense and painful atmosphere of the ongoing war in the Middle East. The album blends songs of rage and sorrow with tracks expressing a longing for comfort and unity. Influenced by elements of new wave rock and hip-hop, the album retains the band’s signature sense of humor and features short, candid studio conversations interspersed between songs, offering an intimate glimpse into the creative process.

In early April 2025, the band released a music video for the song "Kadour Niv'at" (Hebrew: כדור נבעט, lit. "A Ball Is Kicked"), created in collaboration with director Doral Sivan. The video centers around a circumcision ceremony and incorporates imagery of religion, ritual, and propaganda. It offers a critical perspective on the militarized reality dictated by governments and organizations, portraying an endless cycle of bloodshed.

The band launched the album with a live performance at the "Barby" Club in Jaffa, featuring guest artist Efrat Gosh.

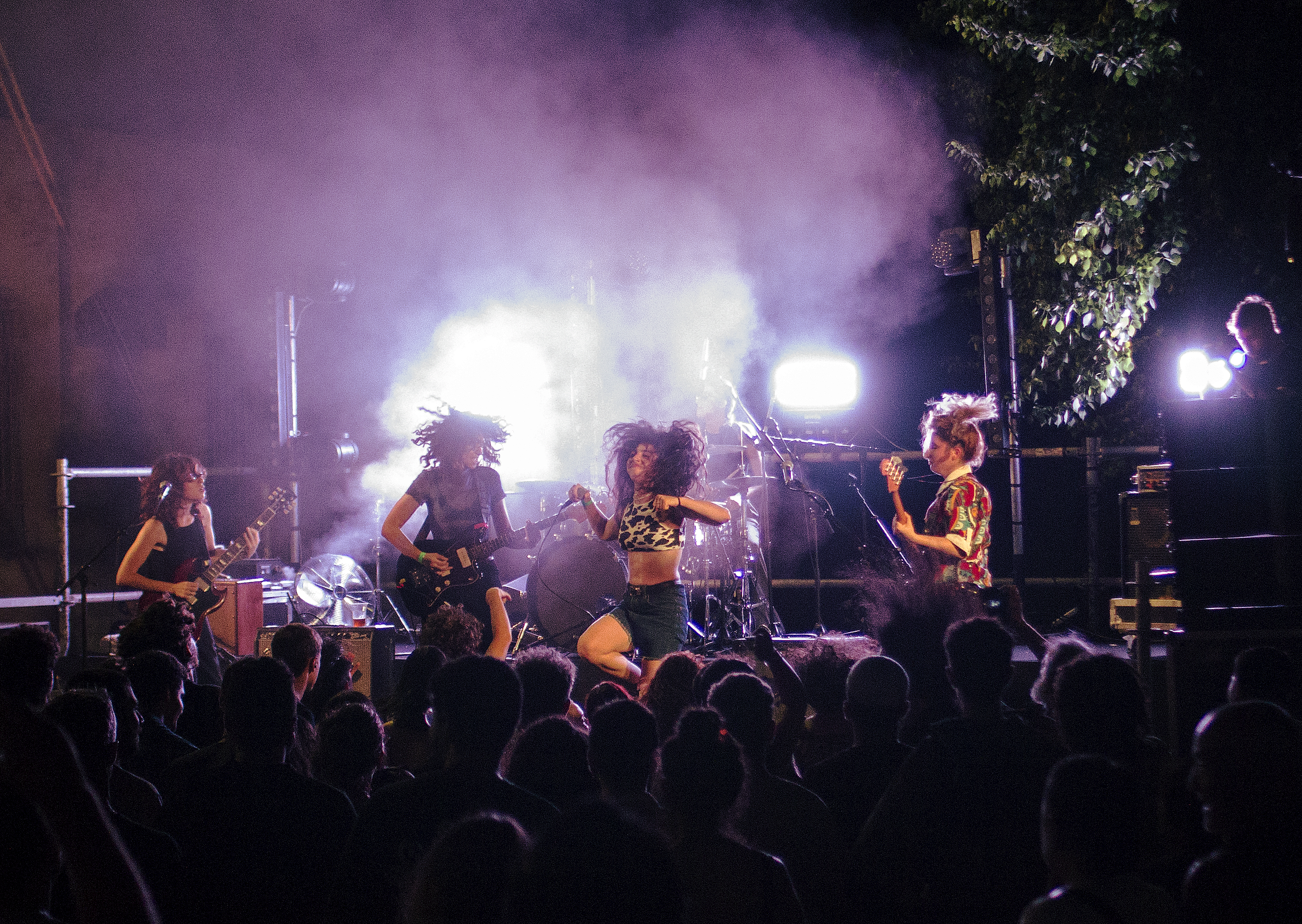
HAZE'EVOT 2024

In December 2025, the band released a concept mini-album titled After the Boom, which was distributed exclusively to members of the band’s Patreon community. The album was written and recorded in a residential shelter in June 2025, during a period of Iranian attacks on Israel. It is an acoustic album, focusing on minimalist arrangements and an intimate atmosphere. The album cover was painted by the artist Ze'ev Engelmayer.

== Discography ==
=== Adamot Yeveshot - 1st EP ===
No.	Title	Length
1.	"Adamot yeveshot"	3:36
2.	"Imaginary Person"	2:58
3.	"Omeret Lo"	3:24
4.	"Tachzor"	4:27
5.	"Back home"	3:25
6.	"Hatsi kilo arad"	3:31
Total length:		21:21

=== Haze'evot - 2nd EP ===
No.	Title	Length
1.	"Everyday"	2:47
2.	"Bohu habaita"	3:01
3.	"Yoredet Veolla"	3:11
4.	"Touch me"	2:45
5.	"Ani Yodea Shratzit"	4:27
Total length:		16:11

=== Haaretz HaShtucha (The Flat Earth) - Studio Album ===
No.	Title	Length
1.	"Haaretz HaShtucha (The Flat Earth)"	2:40
2.	"Malkat HaKita (The Class Queen)"	3:54
3.	"Shaot Smechot (Happy Hours)"	3:12
4.	"Almana Shchora (Black Widow)"	3:20
5.	"Bo (Come)"	3:30
6.	"Kfiut Tova (Ungratefulness)"	3:44
7.	"Black Friday"	3:30
8.	"Aba Shel Shira (Shira's Dad)"	3:41
9.	"Al Tagid Li Ulai (Don't Tell Me Maybe)"	2:26
10.	"Le'ehov et Anna (Loving Anna)"	4:12
Total length:		34:09

=== Ze Ma Yesh (That's What We've Got) - Studio Album ===
No.	Title	Length
1.	"Nachashei HaPachad (Snakes of Fear)"	2:45
2.	"Ze Ma Yesh (That's What We've Got)"	3:22
3.	"Albon"	0:08
4.	"Balagan (Riot)"	2:43
5.	"Ganevet (Thief)"	3:48
6.	"Shum Davar Lo Sheli (Nothing Is Mine)"	2:54
7.	"Afsut (Zeroness)"	0:21
8.	"Zanav La Ariot (Tail To The Lions)"	3:22
9.	"Kadur Nivat (A Ball Was Kicked)"	3:24
10.	"Adama (Earth)"	4:15
11.	"Banot (Girls)"	0:20
12.	"Schmetterling"	2:04
13.	"Tochniot Milut (Escape Plans)"	6:01
14.	"Hilton"	1:04
Total length:		36:34
