= Yehiel Bar =

Israeli politician

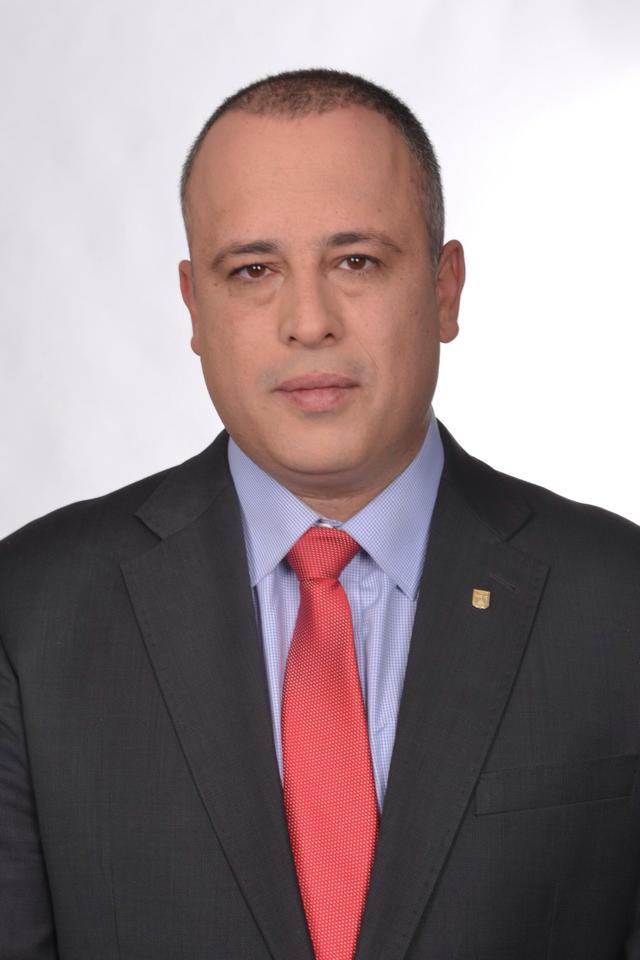

Faction represented in the Knesset
- 2013–2015: Labor Party
- 2015–2019: Zionist Union
- 2019: Labor Party

Personal details
- Born: 4 September 1975 (age 50) Safed, Israel

Yehiel "Hilik" Bar (Hebrew: יחיאל "חיליק" בר; born 4 September 1975) is a former Member of Knesset for the Israel Labor Party, Secretary General of the Labor Party, and was the Deputy Speaker of the Knesset. Bar previously served as a member of the Jerusalem City Council on behalf of mayor Nir Barkat's "Yerushalayim Tazliach" (Jerusalem Will Succeed) party, holding the Tourism and Foreign Relations portfolios for the city.

== Biography ==
Bar was born in a low-income neighborhood in Safed the eldest of five children of a Moroccan immigrant father and an Ashkenazic mother. He has stated, "I am a proud half-Moroccan, half-Ashkenazi." Bar was a camper and camp counsellor at "HaNoar HaOved VeHeLomed" (The Federation of Working and Studying Youth) in Safed, and was an active leader in Labor Youth. His father served as deputy mayor and secretary of the Workers' Council on behalf of the Labor Party.

Bar studied at Bezek College at Givat Mordechai in Jerusalem. He served in the Israeli Defense Force as an officer in Adjutant Corps and reached the rank of captain in the reserves, later studying at the Hebrew University in Jerusalem. From 1998 he served as chairman of the student organization ("Ofek") of the Labor Party at Hebrew University, chairman of the national student organization of the Labor Party, and Chairman of the World Youth of the World Labour Zionist Movement.

Bar served as an Advisor to Minister Dalia Itzik in the Environment Ministry and the Ministry of Industry and Trade; an adviser to Acting Mayor of the Jerusalem Municipality, Professor Shimon Shetreet; Director of Development Economics and Higher Education in the Jerusalem Municipality; Project Manager for the Jerusalem Conference with the Zionist Council for Israel; and adviser to National Infrastructure Minister Binyamin Ben-Eliezer in Ariel Sharon's second administration and Ehud Olmert's government. It was during this time that he also served as advisor to Ben-Eliezer while the latter served as Minister of Industry.

During his public service he completed his BA in political science and international relations and MA in international relations at the Hebrew University. In 2008 he was accepted to the master's program at the Kennedy School of Government at Harvard University, but passed on the opportunity in order to continue his public service.

Since 2002, Bar has been a delegate at the World Zionist Congress and the World Zionist Council. He is actively involved in pro-Israel advocacy and has taken part in advocacy and coexistence missions around the world, in the course of which he met with US President George W. Bush and other senior officials in both the Arab world and the West. In 2003, he was involved in the establishment of the “Young Israeli Forum for Cooperation” (YIFC), an organization whose activity was awarded a special prize by the EU's Minister of Education.

In August 2008, he was elected as Chairman (Secretary) of the Labour Party in Jerusalem.

On 11 November 2008 he was elected to the Jerusalem City Council on Nir Barkat's Jerusalem Will Succeed list, and, up until his election to the Knesset, served as a Council member and executive board member, and held the portfolios of Tourism and Foreign Relations for the municipality.

In 2010, Bar was elected Secretary General of the Labour Party, the youngest person ever to serve in that capacity, and the first to be elected to the post before serving as a Member of Knesset. Following Ehud Barak's retirement as Labor Party chairman in order to establish his Independence Party, the party unanimously re-elected Bar as Secretary General at a conference held on 27 March 2011. After Barak's departure, Bar played a crucial role in leading the rehabilitation of the Labor Party during the transitional period together with temporary chairman Micha Harish, up until the election of Shelly Yachimovich to the party leadership.

In the party primaries prior to the 2013 Knesset elections, Bar won seventh place on the Labor Party's list (in his capacity as Secretary General of the party). As a result of Defense Minister Amir Peretz's resignation (to join Tzipi Livni's Hatnua party), Bar moved up to sixth place on the list. He was elected in January 2013 to serve in Israel's Nineteenth Knesset.

On 16 January 2019, before the elections to the 21st Knesset, he announced his retirement from political life. In these elections he was placed in the symbolic 105th place on the Labor list. Ahead of the elections to the 22nd Knesset elections that took place in September 2019, he was 11th on the Labor-Gesher list and was not elected to the Knesset. Ahead of the elections to the 23rd Knesset in March 2020, he was placed 20th on the Labor-Gesher-Meretz list and not elected. Bar did not run in the elections for the 24th Knesset in 2021.

Bar lives in Jerusalem with his wife and has three children.

== Legislation ==
Bar supported the creation of a new Israeli national holiday, Yom HaAliyah (Hebrew: יום העלייה, Aliyah Day) to be celebrated annually on the tenth of the Hebrew month of Nisan (Hebrew: י' ניסן). On 21 June 2016 the Knesset voted in favor of adding Yom HaAliyah to the national calendar. The final bill was co-sponsored by Knesset members from different parties in show of cooperation across the political spectrum. The day chosen for Yom HaAliyah is, according to the biblical narrative, the day Joshua and the Israelites crossed the Jordan River at Gilgal into the Promised Land. It was thus the first documented "mass Aliyah".

== Controversial visit to Poland in 2017 ==
Bar was part of a delegation of Israeli politicians who visited Poland at the invitation of the Polish Redemptorist priest Tadeusz Rydzyk in late 2017. The purpose of the visit was to support Rydzyk's effort to draw greater attention to the Polish Righteous Among the Nations who saved Jews from the Nazis during the Holocaust.

Rydzyk and his radio station, Radio Maryja, have repeatedly been accused of anti-Semitism, notably by the Anti-Defamation League and the World Jewish Congress.

On 26 October 2017, together with Rabbi Dov Lipman (a former Knesset member of the Yesh Atid party) and Israeli Minister of Communications Ayoub Kara, Bar attended a Radio Maryja commemoration ceremony in Toruń devoted to the theme of "Remembrance and Hope" and attended by then Polish Prime Minister Beata Szydło. The event was held in the Chapel of Remembrance, situated in the Temple of Our Lady the Star of New Evangelization and St. John Paul II and was organized by Rydzyk together with Jonny Daniels, the head of the From The Depths foundation.

Bar was maligned for his support for Rydzyk in the Israeli media, as was Lipman. The Israeli delegation's visit was also met with concerns in the Jewish community of Poland.
