= Yishay Yafeh =

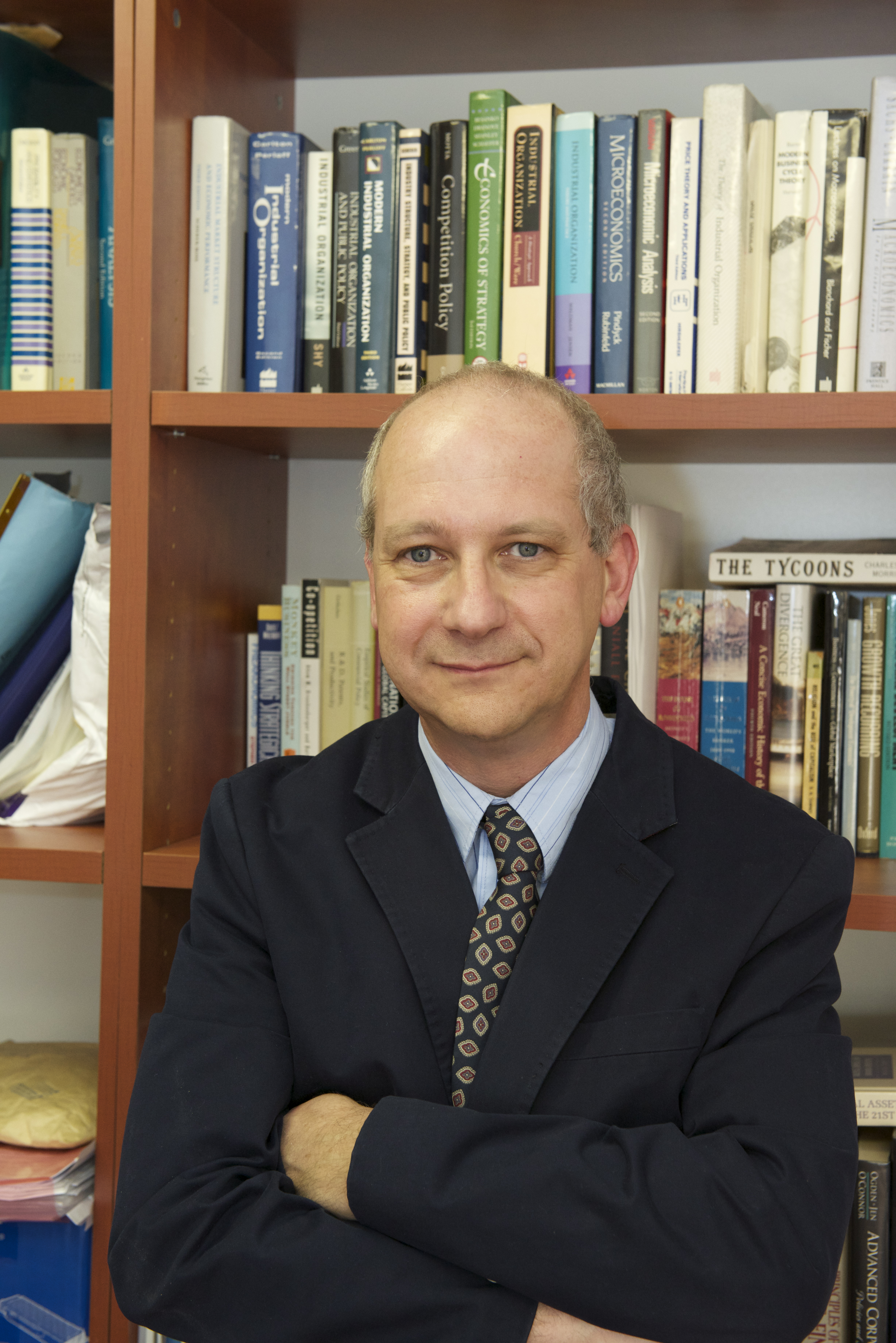
Professor Yishay Yafeh

Yishay Yafeh (Hebrew: ישי יפה; born 1962) is an Economist and a professor of Finance at the Hebrew University of Jerusalem School of Business Administration in Israel. Between 2010 and 2012 he was the vice- dean of the Hebrew University School of Business Administration and the Dean of the School between 2012 and 2016.

== Biography ==
Yafeh had his B.A. in Economics and East Asian Studies from The Hebrew University of Jerusalem and his A.M. and Ph.D. in economics from Harvard University. He was previously an Associate Professor (with tenure) at the Department of Economics of the University of Montreal and visiting professor in Oxford University. Yafeh was an Academic Consultant to the Bank of Israel Research Department and to the Israel Securities Authority. He is a Research Fellow of the Centre for Economic Policy Research (CEPR) in London and of the Research Associate of the European Corporate Governance Institute in Brussels.

At the Hebrew University Yafeh teaches the following courses: Topics in Financial Economics and Law and Finance Workshop.

== Research ==
Yafeh's research fields are Corporate governance, Financial intermediation and banking, The Japanese economy and the economies of East Asia and Economic and financial history. His research papers were published in a leading journals like the Quarterly Journal of Economics, Journal of Finance and Journal of Economic Literature.

Some of his papers are cited hundreds of times. His book, Emerging Markets and Financial Globalization (with the cooperation of Paolo Mauro and Nathan Sussman), was published by the Oxford University Press in 2006.

== Published works ==
- Yafeh, Y., Kandel, E., Kosenko, K. & Morck, R. (2015), "The Great Pyramids of America: A Revised History of US Business Groups, Corporate Ownership and Regulation, 1930-1950", ECGI Finance Working Paper, 449
- Yafeh, Y., Hamdani, A., Kandel, E. & Mugerman, Y. (2016), "Incentive Fees and Competition in Pension Funds: Evidence from a Regulatory Experiment in Israel", NBER Working Paper, 22634
- Yafeh, Y., Fried, J. & Kamar, E. (2016), "Empowering Minority Shareholders and Executive Compensation: Evidence from a Natural Experiment"
- Yafeh, Y., Claessens, S. & Ueda, K. (2014), "Institutions and Financial Frictions: Estimating with Structural Restrictions on Firm Value and Investment", Journal of Development Economics 110, 107–122
- Yafeh, Y. & Hamdani, A. (2013), "Institutional Investors as Minority Shareholders", Review of Finance, 17(2), 691–725
- Yafeh, Y. & Claessens, S. (2013), "Comovement of Newly Added Stocks with National Market Indices: Evidence from around the World ", Review of Finance, 17(1),203-227.
- Yafeh, Y. & Giannetti, M. (2012), "Do Cultural Differences Between Contracting Parties Matter? Evidence from Syndicated Bank Loans"?, Management Science, 58(2), 365–383.
- Yafeh, Y. & Lauterbach, B. (2011), "Long Term Changes in Voting Power and Control Structure following the Unification of Dual Class Shares", Journal of Corporate Finance ,17(2), 215–228.
- Yafeh, Y., Claessens, S. & Ueda, K. (2010), "Financial Frictions, Investment and Institutions", International Monetary Fund, 8170.
- Yafeh, Y. & Khanna, T. (2007), "Business Groups in Emerging Markets: Paragons or Parasites?", Journal of Economic Literature 45(2), 331–373
- Yafeh, Y. & Khanna, T. (2005), "Business Groups and Risk Sharing around the World", Journal of Business, 78(1), 301–340.
- Yafeh, Y., Mayer, C. & Schoors, K. (2005), "Sources of Funds and Investment Strategies of Venture Capital Funds: Evidence from Germany, Israel, Japan and the UK", Journal of Corporate Finance 11(3), 586–608..
- Yafeh, Y. & Sussman, N. (2006), "Institutional Reforms, Financial Development and Sovereign Debt: Britain 1690-1790"', Journal of Economic History, 66(4), 906–935.
- Yafeh, Y. & Mauro, P. (2003), "The Corporation of Foreign Bondholders", IMF Working Paper, 03/107
- Yafeh, Y. & Ber, H. (2007), "Can Venture Capital Funds Pick Winners? Evidence from Pre-IPO Survival Rates and Post-IPO Performance", Israel Economic Review, 5(1), 23–46
- Yafeh. & Miyajima, H. (2007), "Japan's Banking Crisis: An Event-Study Perspective", Journal of Banking and Finance 31(9), 2866–2885
- Yafeh, Y. (2002), "Japan's Corporate Groups: Some International and Historical Perspectives", in M. Blomström, J. Corbett, F. Hayashi and A. Kashyap (eds.), Structural Impediments to Growth in Japan, University of Chicago Press, 259-284 (also appeared as NBER Working Paper,9386, December 2002)
- Yafeh, Y. (2000), "Corporate Governance in Japan: Past Performance and Future Prospects", Oxford Review of Economic Policy, 16(2), 74–84.
- Yafeh, Y. & Sussman, N. (2000), "Institutions, Reforms, and Country Risk: Lessons from Japanese Government Debt in the Meiji Period", Journal of Economic History, 6(2), 442–467.
- Yafeh, Y. & Yosha, O. (2003), "Large Shareholders and Banks: Who Monitors and How?" ,Economic Journal, 113(484), 128–146
- Yafeh, Y., Ber, H. & Yosha, O. (2001), "Conflict of Interests in Universal Banking: Bank Lending, Stock Underwriting and Fund Management", Journal of Monetary Economics, 47(1), 189–218.
- Yafeh, Y. & Yosha, O. (2001), "Organization of Financial Systems and Strategic Use of Relationship Banking", European Finance Review, 5(1–2), 63–78.
- Yafeh, Y. & Blass, A. (2001), "Vagabond Shoes Longing to Stray: Why Foreign Firms List in the United States" ,Journal of Banking and Finance, 25(3), 555–572.
- Yafeh, Y., Mauro, P. & Sussman, N. (2002), "Emerging Markets Spreads: Then Versus Now" , Quarterly Journal of Economics, 117(2), 695–733.
- Yafeh, Y. & Weinstein, D. (1998), "On the Costs of a Bank-Centered Financial System: Evidence from the Changing Main Bank Relations in Japan" ,Journal of Finance, 53(2), 635–672

== Books ==
- Yafeh, Y., Mauro, P. & Sussman, N. (2006), "Emerging Markets and Financial Globalization: Sovereign Bond Spreads in 1870-1913 and Today", Oxford University Press
