= Council of Serdica =

343 synod

Coordinates: 42°00′N 25°00′E

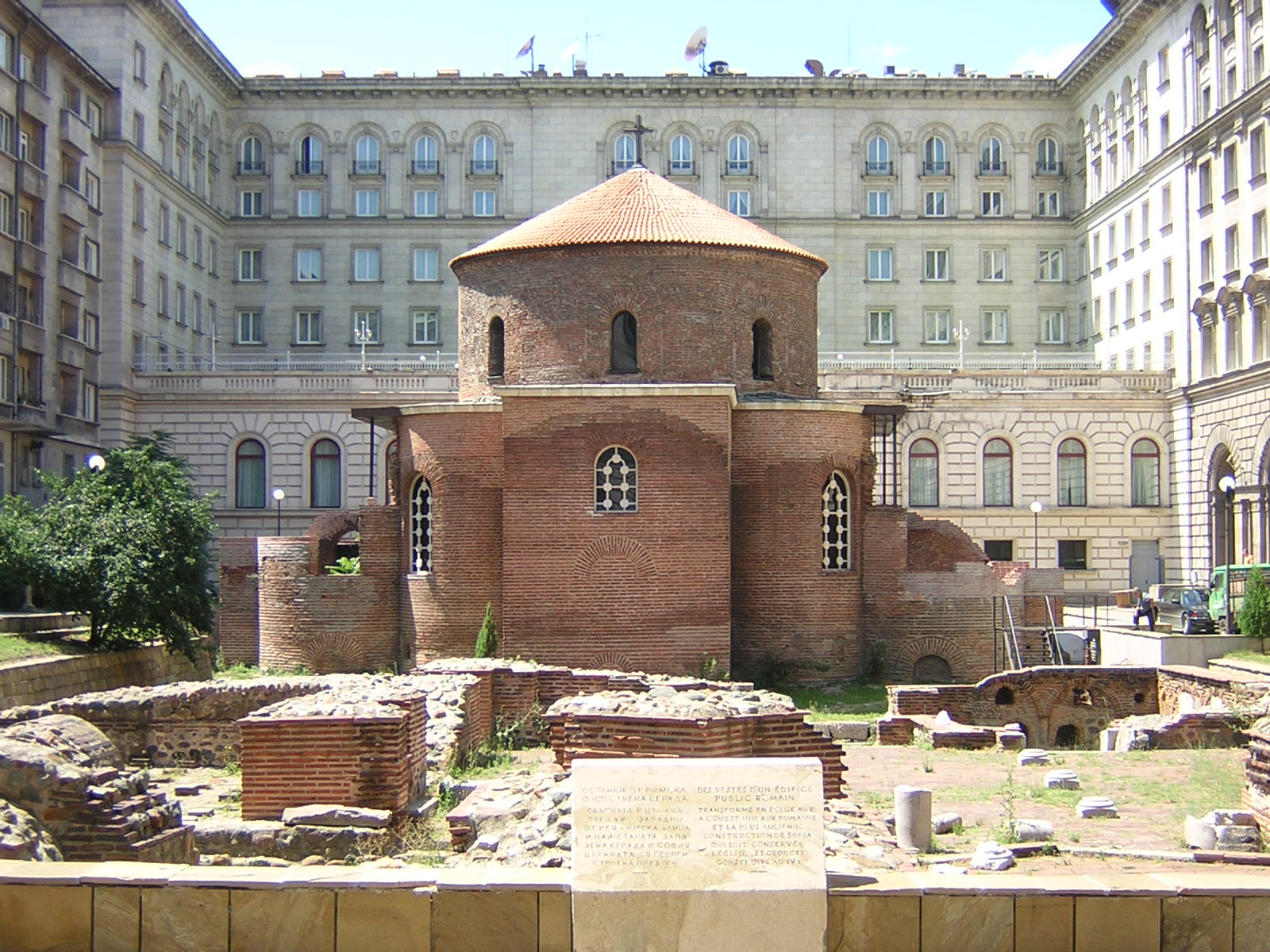
St. Georg rotunda church in Serdica. The so called civil building's remains are visible in front of the church.

The Council of Serdica, or Synod of Serdica (also Sardica), was a synod convened in 343 at Serdica (located in modern-day Sofia, Bulgaria) in the civil diocese of Dacia, by Emperors Constans I, Augustus in the West, and Constantius II, Augustus in the East. (Note: Hess (2002, p. 39 n. 9) dates the council to the autumn of 343 and writes that contemporary scholars generally date it to either 342 or 343. He cites Elliott (1988, pp. 65–72) for 342, and Barnes (1993, p. 71 n. 2 at p. 259) and Stern (2001, pp. 75, 79, 124–125) for 343. Enchiridion symbolorum dates the council to either 342 or the autumn of 343. Ohme (2012, p. 67) dates the council to autumn of 342 and notes that scholarly dating of the event is not resolved. Rudder (1957, p. 579) follows Socrates and Sozomen who date the council to 347. Myers (1910) and Healy (1912), two early 20th century sources, date the council to 343.) It attempted to resolve "the tension between East and West in the Church." "The council was a disaster: the two sides, one from the west and the other from the east, never met as one." (Note: Socrates Scholasticus wrote that according to Athanasius about 300 bishops were present. Andrew Zenos noted in 1890 that Athanasius' figure of 340 included those who attended the council, together with those who did not: bishops who had previously written on behalf of Athanasius to the council and bishops who later signed the conciliar letter sent to them. Zenos also noted that the figure was about 170 in two other works by Athanasius.)

== Calling of the Council ==
"Constans decided to take the initiative ... His brother Constantius … agreed to permit, at the suggestion of Constans, that a grand Ecumenical Council should take place, with the intention of resolving the tension between East and West in the Church, at Serdica, modern Sofia, a city carefully chosen as standing between the Eastern and Western halves of the Roman Empire."

Traditionally, it had been claimed that the council was convened by the two augusti at the request of Pope Julius I. (Note: Socrates Scholasticus, Historia ecclesiastica, 2.20 (NPNF2 2, pp. 46–47); Healy 1912.) However, RPC Hanson wrote:

"The devisers of this meeting were certainly not Eastern bishops. Socrates (HE II.20) expressly says that they did not want to come. It was a small group of Western bishops, influential with Constans, who planned the Council: Maximinus of Trier, Protasius of Milan, Ossius of Cordova, Fortunatianus of Aquileia and Vincent of Capua. Julius of Rome was not a prime mover in the affair; he sent a comparatively minor delegation who kept a low profile."

Since the "devisers" of the council were a small group of bishops who had Constans' ear, the question arises to what extent they represent the general view of the West. After discussing the evidence, Ayres concludes that it is not accurate to describe it as an East/West or a Latin/Greek divide. He says it is an error to assume "that Greek-speaking areas of the east divided clearly in theology from the Latin-speaking west. … ‘East’ vs. ‘West’ is far too clumsy a tool of analysis for almost anything in the fourth century."

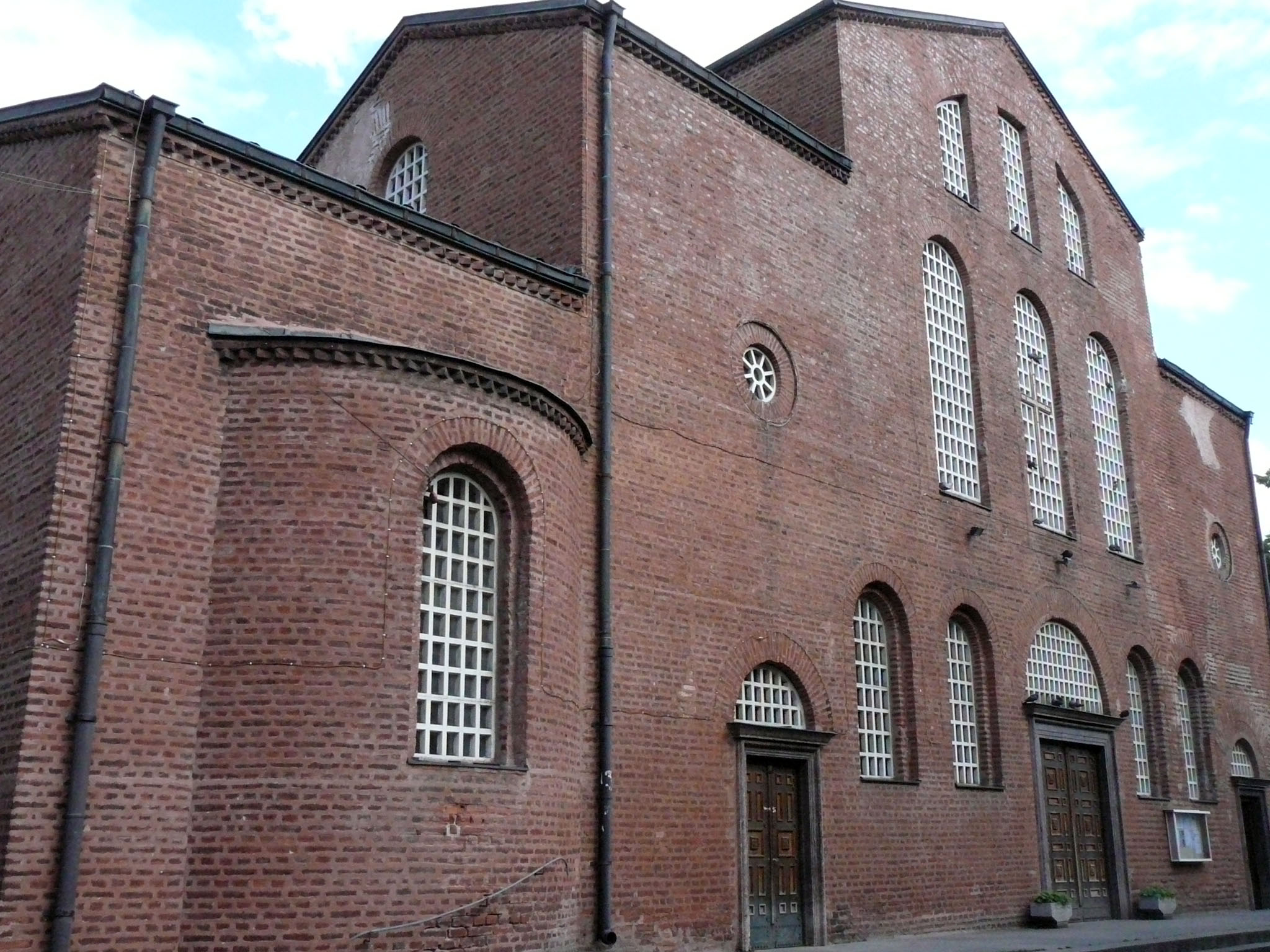
St. Sophia church in Serdica

== Delegates ==
"In 343 … about 90 bishops from the West and about 80 from the East set off to meet in Serdica. Constans himself, accompanied by Athanasius and several other Eastern bishops who had been deposed during the past twenty years, attended the encounter." "Athanasius, Asclepas and Marcellus were present as Eastern bishops with a grievance." These Eastern bishops were deposed by Eastern courts. Their attendance under the protection of the Western emperor was a direct challenge and insult by Emperor Constans to the authority of the Eastern church.

At this time, "Constantius was on the Eastern frontier occupied with war against the Persians." He did not attend. "He sent the comes Strategius Musonianus and the castrensis Hesychius, to assist the Eastern bishops in their journey and ordered Philagrius (an official experienced in troublesome ecclesiastical matters, now comes in Thrace), to accompany them on their journey from Philippopolis to Serdica."

Consistent with the principle that a small group of Western bishops were the "devisers" of this council, the Western delegates came from a relatively small part of the Western Empire:

"At least half of those attending the ‘western’ meeting were from areas to the east of northern Italy and the largest single block of attendees were the Greek and Balkan bishops. The ‘western’ council was as localized as most during this century."

Julius I was represented by the priests Archidamus and Philoxenus, and the deacon Leo. Athanasius reported that bishops attended from Roman diocese of Hispania, Gaul, Britain, Italy, Africa, Egypt, Syria, Thrace and Pannonia. Constantius II was represented by Strategius Musonianus and Hesychius of Antioch.

== The Council never met ==
Later descriptions claim that the event was never a council.

"The council was a disaster: the two sides, one from the west and the other from the east, never met as one." "It was in fact a debacle rather than a Council, and it is absurd to reckon it among the General Councils."

"The unwilling Eastern bishops ... on reaching Serdica were housed in a wing of the imperial palace and carefully kept from informal contact with the Western bishops." They refused to allow Marcellus and Athanasius to participate in the discussions and the Westerners would not allow the meeting to continue without them:

"The majority (of the ‘easterners’) refused to meet with the ‘westerners’ who wished Athanasius and Marcellus to be allowed normal participation in the meeting." These two bishops "had been tried, condemned and deposed by regularly convened and ordered Eastern councils." Athanasius had been found guilty of "tyrannical behaviour." "The Easterners had no intention of allowing the Westerners to review decisions which they were competent to make. … The Easterners had a perfectly good case, and this fact until recently has not been sufficiently realized. Western bishops had no right to review the verdicts of Eastern councils. … Metropolitan jurisdictions were fairly clearly established in the East but were still in an uncertain and unformed state in the West."

"Athanasius was deservedly unpopular in the East. Serious attempts were made to overcome the impasse. Ossius more than ten years later said that he had gone so far as to offer to take back Athanasius with him to Spain if the Easterners would join him in discussion, but the distrustful Eastern bishops refused this suggestion."

Both sides took the most imprudent measures towards the others: "The Western bishops examined the cases of Athanasius, of Marcellus, of Asclepas and of Lucius all over again and declared them innocent." They "stigmatized all the Easterners as Arians" and excommunicated Eastern leaders. "The ‘easterners’ ... excommunicated all the ‘western’ leaders at Serdica" and "branded all the Westerners as Sabellians." "Intended as a means of healing a dangerous rift which was developing between the Eastern and Western Church, it succeeded only in widening that rift to an apparently unbridgeable extent."

== Historical context ==
=== Council of Nicaea ===
This dispute that prevented the entire council from meeting already began at Nicaea, where Alexander formed an alliance with Marcellus and some other Sabellians:

"Simonetti estimates the Nicene Council as a temporary alliance for the defeat of Arianism between the tradition of Alexandria led by Alexander and 'Asiatic' circles (i.e. Eustathius, Marcellus) whose thought was at the opposite pole to that of Arius. … Alexander … accepted virtual Sabellianism in order to ensure the defeat of Arianism." "Marcellus learnt the main lines of his theology from Eustathius." "Eustathius and Marcellus … certainly met at Nicaea. and no doubt were there able to join forces with Alexander of Alexandria and Ossius."

Since Constantine had taken Alexander's part, Alexander's alliance was able to dominate the council, including to insert in the Creed the term homoousios which hitherto was preferred only by the Sabellians.

"Ossius of Cordoba probably chaired the meeting; Eustathius of Antioch, Marcellus of Ancyra, and Alexander must all have been key players in the discussions." "Marcellus of Ancyra … had been an important figure at the council and may have significantly influenced its wording."

"Athanasius was certainly present as a deacon accompanying Alexander of Alexandria. … But it is equally certain that he can have taken no prominent nor active part, in spite of later legends to this effect and the conviction of some scholars that he was the moving spirit in the Council."

=== After Nicaea ===
After Nicaea, Marcellus was deposed for Sabellianism. "Marcellus of Ancyra had produced a theology … which could quite properly be called Sabellian."

After Alexander died in 328, Athanasius, who was still underage, became bishop of Alexandria. However, more or less at the same time as Marcellus, Athanasius was found guilty of violence and "tyrannical behaviour" and exiled. Both Marcellus and Athanasius were bishops in the eastern part of the Empire, were deposed by the Eastern Church, and were exiled to Rome. What is less well known, is that both Athanasius and Marcellus taught one single hypostasis.

"Athanasius and Marcellus could come together in Rome. The perception that these two trajectories held to very similar beliefs would help to shape widespread eastern antipathy to both in the years after Nicaea." "The fragments of Eustathius that survive present a doctrine that is close to Marcellus, and to Alexander and Athanasius. Eustathius insists there is only one hypostasis." (Eustatius was another important Sabellian in the fourth century.)

For that reason, Athanasius and Marcellus, while in Rome, were able to form an alliance against those who taught that the Father, Son, and Spirit are three hypostases (three Centres of Consciousness or three Minds):

"They considered themselves allies." "Athanasius and Marcellus now seem to have made common cause against those who insisted on distinct hypostases in God."

While in Rome, Athanasius also developed his polemical strategy:

"Athanasius’ engagement with Marcellus in Rome seems to have encouraged Athanasius towards the development of" "an increasingly sophisticated account of his enemies;" "the full flowering of a polemical strategy that was to shape accounts of the fourth century for over 1,500 years;" "a masterpiece of the rhetorical art."

This included the claim that all of his enemies are Arians (followers of Arius), which they were not, and that Athanasius himself was deposed due to an Arian ‘conspiracy’, which is also not true.

Constantine was emperor of the entire Roman Empire and was able to limit religious disagreements between factions in the church. However, after he died in 337, his sons divided the empire between them. This created the opportunity for theologies to develop in different directions in the eastern and western parts of the empire.

After the empire was divided, Athanasius was able to convince the bishop of Rome of his polemical strategy. "Athanasius appealed to Julius of Rome in 339–40 by using his strategy of narrating a theological conspiracy of ‘Arians’. His success had a profound impact on the next few years of the controversy." He and Marcellus were also able to convince the bishop of Rome of their orthodoxy and of Athanasius’ innocence. "Julius (bishop of Rome), in the year 341, summoned a council to Rome, which vindicated the orthodoxy of Marcellus, as well as that of Athanasius." However, since both Marcellus and Athanasius were Eastern bishops and were deposed by the Eastern Church, their vindication by the Western Church created tension between the East and the West. In the year 341, the bishop of Rome attacked the Eastern Church by means of a letter, using Athanasius’ polemical strategy and accusing the Eastern Church of being ‘Arians’, meaning followers of Arius. "Julius wrote to the east in 341 in a letter which shows the strong influence of the emerging Athanasian account of ‘Arianism’." This exacerbated the division between East and West. "Once Julius had acted we begin to see divisions between the Church in the eastern and western halves of the empire emerging." The Eastern Dedication Council of 431 discussed and rejected that letter.

"Early in the year 342 a delegation from the Eastern Church presented itself at the court of the Emperor Constans in Trier. … It carried with it the Fourth Creed of Antioch 341 and asked the Emperor to consider it. As a gesture of reconciliation, this embassy was fruitless, because nobody in the West took any notice of the creed."

== Council of Serdica ==
It was in this context that a small group of bishops convinced Constans to propose an "ecumenical council’ at Serdica. To add insult to injury, the Western delegation included the deposed Eastern bishops. For that reason, the two groups of bishops never met as one. The Easterners refused to allow these deposed bishops to take part in the Council and the Westerners refused to meet without them. "So ended the Council of Serdica. Intended as a means of healing a dangerous rift which was developing between the Eastern and Western Church, it succeeded only in widening that rift to an apparently unbridgeable extent."

== The Role of the Emperor ==
It was Emperor Constans who took the initiative. In the fourth century, the emperor was the final arbiter in doctrinal disputes. If we ask the question, what was considered to constitute the ultimate authority in doctrine during the period reviewed in these pages, there can be only one answer. The will of the Emperor was the final authority."

Only the emperors could arrange a general council like this one. In fact, these 'ecumenic councils' were the tools through which the emperors governed the church. "The general council was the very invention and creation of the Emperor. General councils, or councils aspiring to be general, were the children of imperial policy and the Emperor was expected to dominate and control them."

This council was probably not the emperor's idea. The idea probably originated from one of his trusted bishops. The council, however, would not have been possible without the approvals of the emperors. Constans brought deposed Eastern bishops under his protection to the council. That was a direct attack on the Eastern Church.

Constantius sent a military official and two comes (trusted officials from the Imperial Court) with the Eastern bishops. After the council, he "duly exiled Lucius of Adrianople and some Egyptian clergy who had met with the Easterners' disapproval." We can assume, therefore, that the decision not to meet with the Western bishops was precisely consistent with his instructions for the council. It may, therefore, be said that this entire affair was part of the struggle between the two emperors for supremacy.

== Eastern Documents ==
"The Eastern bishops only produced one document, that which was composed at Serdica and published at Philippopolis." "This formula is no more or less than the Fourth Creed of Antioch 341, the one sent vainly to Constans, with an addition to the anathemas at the end tacked on to it. The addition runs thus:

'Likewise the holy and Catholic Church anathematizes those who say,

- that there are three Gods, or
- that Christ is not God, and
- that before the ages he was neither Christ nor the Son of God, or
- that Father, Son and Holy Spirit are the same, or
- that the Son is ingenerate, or
- that the Father did not beget the Son by his counsel and Will.

Clearly they wish in this addition to allay Western fears that in maintaining the existence of three hypostases within the Godhead they are falling into tritheism, and to reject Arian doctrine equally with Sabellianism."

The Easterners "reject Arian doctrine equally with Sabellianism." "Their profession of faith cannot possibly be described as Arian. But neither is intended to be a supplement to N. It is the production of men who were searching for a substitute for N."

=== Western Documents ===
"The Western bishops remained at Serdica for some time after the departure of the Eastern bishops and occupied themselves not only in launching anathemas and acquitting the accused but also in producing 'several documents." Ossius was their chairperson. "From the assembly of Western bishops in Serdica, or in connection with them emerged no less than eight documents." "Ossius was generally regarded as the leader of the Westerners."

They re-examined the cases of Athanasius, Marcellus, and Asclepas and declared them innocent. In addition to this, they passed censure on the Eastern bishops, and several of them were deposed and excommunicated. Asclepas of Gaza was reinstated as bishop of the diocese of Gaza and Quintianus, who in the meantime had usurped the episcopal see, was excommunicated.

==== Homoousios ====
It is often claimed that the Westerners were "mostly of the Western Homoousian faction." However, nobody at Serdica, not even the Western delegates used the term homoousios. In fact, during this period of history, nobody used the term homoousios. "The Western Council of Serdica of 343 produced a document, written by Protogenes of Serdica and Ossius, which opted clearly for Una substantia meaning one hypostasis." Ayres concludes:

These events show that participants at Nicaea, "such as Ossius, Athanasius, and Marcellus" were "willing to turn to an alternative statement of faith, just as many of their eastern counterparts had done at Antioch two years before." "This reflects … a context in which conciliar formulations were not seen as fixed."

==== Western Statement ====
Hanson quotes the Western statement of faith in full:

(1) 'We disqualify and extrude from the catholic church those who assert that Christ is indeed God,

(2) but that he is not true God, that he is Son, but not true Son; that he is begotten and at the same time has come into existence; for this is the way in which they regularly interpret "begotten", professing, as we have said above, that "begotten" is "having come into existence"; [and that though Christ has existed before the ages they assign to him a beginning and an end which he has not in time but before all time].

(3) And recently two adders have been born from the Arian asp, Valens and Ursacius. who declare and state, without equivocation, though they call themselves Christian, that the Logos and the Spirit was pierced and wounded and died and rose again, and (what the heretical rabble likes to claim) that the hypostases of the Father and of the Son and of the Holy Spirit are distinct and are separate,

(4) But we have received and have been taught this (tradition), we have this catholic and apostolic tradition: that there is one hypostasis, which the heretics (also) call ousia, of the Father and of the Son and of the Holy Spirit. And if anyone asks, "What is the hypostasis of the Son?", it is obviously that which is of the sole Father. We confess that neither the Father ever existed without the Son nor the Son without the Spirit nor ever could [text corrupt here]. The witness of the Son himself is [Jn I4:10] and [Jn 10:30].

(5) None of us denies the term "begotten" ( ... ) but begotten in what circumstances? (do we say), the artificer of archangels and angels and the world and the human race was begotten along with absolutely everything else which is called visible and invisible, because the text runs [Wisd 7:22] and [Jn 1:3]? For he could never have received beginning of existence, for the Logos of God exists eternally and has no beginning, nor does he undergo an end.

(6) We do not say that the Father is the Son, nor again that the Son is Father. But the Father is Father and the Son (is) Son of the Father. We confess that the Son is the power of the Father. We confess the < h > e is the Logos of God the Father, beside whom there is no other, and the Logos is true God and Wisdom and Power. We have handed down that he is true Son, but we do not name him Son as other sons are named, because they are named sons either by adoption or because they have been born again or because they deserve (the name), not because of the single hypostasis, which is that of the Father and of the Son.

(7) We confess that he is Only-begotten and First-born; but the Logos is Only-begotten since he always was and is in the Father, but the term "first-born" applies to his humanity and to the new creation, because he is also first-born from the dead. We confess that there is one God, we confess one Godhead of Father and Son.

(8) And nobody denies that the Father is somehow greater than the Son, not because of another hypostasis nor because of any difference but because the name of Father itself is greater than 'Son".

(9) This is their blasphemous and corrupt interpretation; they contend that he said [Jn 10:30] because of the agreement and harmony. We who are catholics condemn this silly and wretched idea of theirs. Just as mortal men when they begin to differ confront each other in their disputes and then again return to reconciliation, so they say that differences and disputes could exist between God the Father Almighty and the Son, which is altogether absurd either to think or to conjecture.

(10) But we believe and affirm and so think, that he uttered [Jn 10:30] with his sacred voice because of the unity of the hypostasis, which is a single one of Father and of Son. This we have always believed, that he reigns without beginning and without end with the Father and that his kingdom has neither term nor decline, because what exists eternally has neither begun to exist nor can decline.

(11) We believe in and hand down the Comforter the Holy Spirit which the Lord promised and sent to us. And we believe that he was sent. And he (the Spirit) did not suffer, but the man whom he put on, whom he assumed from the Virgin Mary, the man who was capable of suffering, because man is mortal but God immortal. We believe that he rose again the third day, and God did not rise in the man but the man in God, (the man) whom he also offered to the Father as his gift, whom he had freed. We believe that at a proper and determined time he will judge all men and all causes.

(12) Such is their folly and their mind is blinded by so thick a darkness that they cannot see the light of truth. They do not understand the words of the text [Jn 17:21]. It is clear why "one" (is said), because the apostles have received the Holy Spirit of God, but not however that they themselves were Spirit nor any of them was Logos or Wisdom or Power nor was any only-begotten [Jn 17:21]. But the divine utterance carefully distinguished: "they may be one in us", It says; It did not say "we are one I and the Father"; but the disciples are linked and united among themselves by their confession of faith, so that they could be one in grace and worship of God the Father and ill the peace and love of our Lord and Saviour'.

While the Eusebians taught that "the Son suffering as God and not only as man," this document claims that only "the man whom he put on" suffered.

=== One hypostasis ===
This statement explicitly says, "we have this catholic and apostolic tradition: that there is one hypostasis, which the heretics (also) call ousia." Therefore, "most significant of all ... is the fact that the writers of this profession of faith have no word for what was later to be called 'Person' in a Trinitarian context, and in fact their thought upon the subject is so confused that one can understand why they gave their opponents the impression that they were Sabellians." "Zeiller and Declercq find the profession of faith gravely embarrassing. both because it appears to commit the Western church to a form of Sabellianism, approved or at least not reproved by the Pope, and by a Council which had also passed canons so congenial to later Ultramontamsm. and also because Athanasius, their paragon, in 362 violently denied that the Council of Serdica had produced any such statement, though he certainly knew that it had."

=== Nicene Creed ===
"Ossius and Protogenes ... describe the formula with which the Encyclical ends as simply a justification and clarification of the creed of Nicaea. Had this letter come into the hands of an Eastern theologian it would only have confirmed his suspicion that N was of a dangerously Sabellian tendency." This again raises the question whether these Western bishops were representative of the general Western view.

==== Incarnation ====
"It is hard to avoid the impression that the Incarnation consisted of the Spirit taking a body which did the suffering, and that the Son is not distinguishable from the Spirit."

The question of a new creed containing some additions to that of Nicaea was discussed, but the bishops decided to add nothing to the accepted creed, and thus gave the Arians no pretext for saying that hitherto they had not been explicitly condemned. Though the form of a proposed creed was presented to the council, it was inserted in the encyclical addressed by the council to "all the bishops of the Catholic Church".

== Background ==
The first ecumenical council (Nicaea I) canon 5 decreed that bishops should convene in biannual synods within every province to act as a court of second instance and review cases with excommunication sentences pronounced by individual bishops. (Note: Council of Nicaea I, c. 5 (NPNF2 14, p. 13), cited in Hess (2002, pp. 101, 181).) But, there was no appeal to a court of final instance "if an unjust sentence was imposed" by a provincial synod acting as a court of second instance. Nicaea I canon 5 "implied that" provincial synods "had an acknowledged authority to" judge the acts of individual bishops of their province. Provincial synods' authority "was becoming well established in the East" prior to the council of Serdica. In 341, the Synod of Antioch canons 14 and 15 "were designed both to augment the authority of the provincial synod as a trial court and to ensure the integrity of its operation." (Note: Synod of Antioch, cc. 14–15 (NPNF2 14, pp. 115–116), cited in Hess (2002, p. 181).)

Athanasius of Alexandria was deposed and excommunicated by Eusebians at the first Synod of Tyre (Tyre I) in 335. He was subsequently exiled from Egypt in 339. Thereafter, he appealed the Tyre I sentence to Julius I. Julius I then summoned the Eastern bishops to Rome in 340 to review the Tyre I sentence. Overall, the Eastern bishops rejected the review of the Tyre I sentence and formulated a new creed at the Synod of Antioch in 341. Constans I and Julius I commissioned Bishop Hosius of Cordova, who previously presided over Nicaea I, to preside over the council.

Hosius and other bishops desired final judgments in the cases of Athanasius and other bishops who had been alternately condemned and vindicated by councils in the East and the West. They also desired to definitively settle the confusion arising from the many doctrinal formulas in circulation, and suggested that all such matters should be referred to an ecumenical council. In order to make the council thoroughly representative, Serdica was chosen as the meeting location.

In 340 Athanasius of Alexandria was expelled from his diocese by the Arians. After spending three years in Rome, Athanasius went to Gaul to confer with Hosius. From there, they went to the Council of Serdica, which began in the summer, or, at latest, in the autumn of 343.

== Canons ==
Before separating, the bishops promulgated approximately 20 canons, especially about the transfer of bishops and about trials and appeals of bishops. These canons and other conciliar documents were sent to Julius with a letter signed by the majority of the bishops. The canons were originally composed in Greek and both Greek and Latin versions are extant. (Note: The canons are not organized uniformly but with different numbers in different collections of canons. There are "small divergences in meaning between" Greek and Latin versions of the canons. It is generally accepted that the Latin version is closer to the original, according to Ohme (2012, p. 70). According to Hess (2002, p. 211), Turner (1930, pp. 490–531) (EOMIA) contains critical editions of the Latin, Greek, and Theodosian versions, furthermore Turner (1930, pp. 452–487) contains a critical apparatus of the Latin version.) The canons are "now universally accepted" as genuine.

In addition to the attempt to resolve the Arian issue, other major points were:

- Canon 1: "corruption must be done away with from its foundation." Bishops must not move from his own city to another more populated place because those men who move "are serving ambition and aiming at the possession of power." Bishops who move from their own city are to be punished sternly and "shall not even be admitted to lay communion." (Note: Council of Serdica, c. 1 (NPNF2 14, p. 415; Hess 2002, pp. 213, 227, 241, 243; Rudder 1957, pp. 583–584). In Hess (2002, p. 210): canon 1 (Latin) $\equiv$ I (Greek) $\equiv$ T1 (Theodosian).)
- Canon 2: if "it is evident that a few persons could have been" bribed "to raise an uproar in the church, and seem to ask for the said man as bishop," then those, who "allege as an excuse and affirm that" the candidate to the office of bishop "received letters from the people," "must be condemned" as frauds and "should not receive" communion even when dying. Aléxios Aristinos commented that this penalty – denying communion as a last rite – is not imposed anywhere else by any canon or for any sin. (Note: Council of Serdica, c. 2 (NPNF2 14, pp. 415–416; Hess 2002, pp. 213, 227, 243; Rudder 1957, pp. 584–585). In Hess (2002, p. 210): canon 2 (Latin) $\equiv$ II (Greek) $\equiv$ T2 (Theodosian).) (Note: Norton (2007, pp. 37 38) wrote that the Latin version of canon 2 leaves "no doubt that the services of claques were available" to influence the process of episcopal elections.)
- Canon 6: bishops should be ordained based on necessity and appointed to populous cities and not to small towns or villages where one presbyter suffices. (Note: Council of Serdica, c. 6 (Latin) (NPNF2 14, p. 420 as c. 6b; Hess 2002, pp. 215, 231, 245–246; Rudder 1957, pp. 587–588). In Hess (2002, p. 210): canon 6 (Latin) $\equiv$ VIb (Greek) $\equiv$ T9 (Theodosian).)
- Canon 8: bishops should not go to a court of a Roman Emperor, unless invited or summoned by imperial letters, except to petition for the good of the church, or for succour and pardon of those suffering from an injustice or a sentence of deportation. (Note: Council of Serdica, c. 8 (Latin) (NPNF2 14, pp. 421–422 as c. 7; Hess 2002, pp. 217, 231, 247; Rudder 1957, pp. 588–590). In Hess (2002, p. 210): canon 8 (Latin) $\equiv$ VII (Greek) $\equiv$ T10 (Theodosian).)

=== Episcopal candidates ===
- Canon 10a: a man shall not be ordained a bishop before he has "fulfilled the ministry of a reader and the office of deacon and presbyter." These promotions take considerable time and can test "his faith, his discretion, his gravity and modesty." Let him be ordained a bishop after he is found worthy. Order and discipline forbids a novice from being ordained bishop, presbyter, or deacon, since Paul of Tarsus had forbidden it. (Note: Council of Serdica, c. 10a (Latin) (NPNF2 14, pp. 424–425; Hess 2002, pp. 219, 233, 247; Rudder 1957, pp. 590–591). In Hess (2002, p. 210): canon 10a (Latin) $\equiv$ IXb (Greek) $\equiv$ included in T12 (Theodosian).) (Note: Rudder (1957, p. 592) cites 1 Timothy 3:6 and 5:22.) Men "whose life has been tested and their merit approved by length of time" should be ordained. (Note: While Nicaea I canon 2 is an injunction against the ordination of neophytes, according to Norton (2007, p. 46), Sardica canon 10a adds considerable time in ministry as a required qualification of episcopal candidates.)

=== Right of appeal ===
The appeal canons – 3b, 3c, 4, 7 – along with canon 17 "provided recourse to assistance by the bishop of Rome for bishops who claimed unfair treatment from judgement by their peers." (Note: Hess 2002, p. 179; see Dvornik 1979, p. 43.)

- Canon 3b: if a bishop is the complainant in a case against another bishop of his province, neither the complainant nor the accused can ask a bishop from another province to judge the case. (Note: Council of Serdica, c. 3b (NPNF2 14, p. 417; Hess 2002, pp. 213, 227, 243; Rudder 1957, pp. 585–586; DH 2012, n. 133). In Hess (2002, p. 210): canon 3b (Latin) $\equiv$ IIIb (Greek) $\equiv$ T4 (Theodosian).)
- Canon 3c: if a bishop is convicted of an offence by a verdict in a case, and if the convicted bishop objects to the verdict and seeks recourse by asking for reconsideration, then the bishops who judged the case – the trial court – should "honour the memory of St. Peter the Apostle" and write to the bishop of Rome about the case; if the bishop of Rome – the court of second instance – decides that the case should be retried, then "let that be done, and let him appoint judges;" if the bishop of Rome decides that the case should not be retried, then he shall confirm the verdict. (Note: Council of Serdica, c. 3c (NPNF2 14, p. 417; Hess 2002, pp. 213, 227, 229, 243; Rudder 1957, pp. 585–586; DH 2012, n. 133). In Hess (2002, p. 210): canon 3c (Latin) $\equiv$ IIIc (Greek) $\equiv$ T5 (Theodosian).)
- Canon 4: if a bishop is sentenced with deposition in a case by a verdict "of those bishops who have sees in neighbouring places," and if the deposed bishop "announce[s] that his case is to be examined in the city of Rome," then the execution of the sentence is suspended, in that a replacement bishop shall not be ordained to the see of the deposed bishop until after the case has "been determined in the judgment of" the bishop of Rome. (Note: Council of Serdica, c. 4 (NPNF2 14, p. 418; Hess 2002, pp. 215, 229, 245; Rudder 1957, pp. 586; DH 2012, n. 134). In Hess (2002, p. 210): canon 4 (Latin) $\equiv$ IV (Greek) $\equiv$ T6 (Theodosian).)
- Canon 7: if a bishop is deposed from his office by bishops of his region acting as a court, and if the deposed bishop takes refuge with the bishop of Rome and seeks recourse by asking the bishop of Rome for a retrial, and if the bishop of Rome decides that the case should be retried; then the bishop of Rome may write to those bishops of a neighbouring province to investigate and conduct a retrial. The deposed bishop may ask the bishop of Rome to delegate priests to the retrial; at his discretion, the bishop of Rome can send priests acting as legates with his authority to serve as judges in cases where the bishop of Rome decides that the bishops of a neighbouring province alone are insufficient. (Note: Council of Serdica, c. 7 (Latin) (NPNF2 14, p. 419 as c. 5; Hess 2002, pp. 215, 217, 229, 245; Rudder 1957, pp. 586–587; DH 2012, n. 135). In Hess (2002, p. 210): canon 7 (Latin) $\equiv$ V (Greek) $\equiv$ T7 (Theodosian).)
- Canon 17: if a bishop is "quick to anger" and excommunicates a priest or deacon hastily, then the priest or deacon has recourse by asking neighboring bishops, as a court of second instance, for a hearing and review of his case. Provision must be made that an innocent man be not condemned or deprived of communion with the Church; nevertheless, the priest or deacon will remain excluded from communion until his case is decided. A hearing should not be denied. The neighboring bishops, as a court of second instance, may either approve or revise the sentence. Since a bishop should not "suffer wrong or insult," if the neighboring bishops, as a court of second instance, "observe arrogance and pride" in the priest or deacon, then they may admonish the priest or deacon to obey "a bishop whose commands are proper and right." A bishop ought to manifest love and charity to his clergy, and ministers ought to obey their bishop. (Note: Council of Serdica, c. 17 (Latin) (NPNF2 14, pp. 428–429 as c. 14; Hess 2002, pp. 223, 225, 237, 251, 253; Rudder 1957, pp. 594–596). In Hess (2002, p. 210): canon 17 (Latin) $\equiv$ XIV (Greek) $\equiv$ T18 (Theodosian).)

== Legacy ==
Both parties believed they had acted rightly: those of the East, because the Western bishops had insisted that Athanasius and Paul, whom they had deposed, should be accorded seats; and the Western bishops because of the retirement of those who had deposed them before the matter had been examined. The council failed entirely to accomplish its purpose. The council did not universally represent the church and is not one of the ecumenical councils. This council has universal authority in Eastern Orthodox Church, according to the rules of Quinisext Council (canon 2).

Two synodical letters were written: one to the clergy and faithful of Alexandria, the other to the bishops of Egypt and Libya.

The proposed explanatory revision of the Nicene Creed was rejected by the council.

The mutual anathematizations by the council and the counter-synod of Philippopolis led to the first schism between the Eastern Church and the Western Church.

== See also ==
- Council of Philippopolis
- Sardica paschal table

== Works cited ==
- Agapios the Monk; Nicodemus the Hagiorite; Cummings, Denver, eds. (1957). The rudder (Pēdalion) of the metaphorical ship of the One Holy Catholic and Apostolic Church of the Orthodox Christians. Translated by Cummings, Denver (from the 5th Greek ed.). Chicago, IL: Orthodox Christian Educational Society. OCLC 26490803. Archived (PDF) from the original on 2008-07-23.
- Athanasius of Alexandria (1891). "Chapter 3" . In Robertson, Archibald; Schaff, Philip; Wace, Henry (eds.). A select library of the Nicene and post-Nicene fathers of the Christian Church. 2. Vol. 4. Translated by Atkinson, M. (American ed.). Buffalo: Christian Literature – via Wikisource.
- Barnes, Timothy D. (1993). Athanasius and Constantius: theology and politics in the Constantinian Empire. Cambridge, MA: Harvard University Press. ISBN 9780674050679.
- This article incorporates text from a publication now in the public domain: Clifford, Cornelius (1907). "St. Athanasius". In Herbermann, Charles (ed.). Catholic Encyclopedia. Vol. 2. New York: Robert Appleton Company.
- Denzinger, Heinrich; Hünermann, Peter; et al., eds. (2012). Enchiridion symbolorum: a compendium of creeds, definitions and declarations of the Catholic Church (43rd ed.). San Francisco: Ignatius Press. ISBN 978-0898707465.
- Dvornik, Francis (1979) [1966]. Byzantium and the Roman primacy. Translated by Quain, Edwin A. (2nd printing, with corrections, of 1st ed.). New York: Fordham University Press. ISBN 9780823207015.
- Elliott, T. G. (1988). "The date of the Council of Serdica". The Ancient History Bulletin. 2. Calgary: University of Calgary: 65–72. ISSN 0835-3638.
- This article incorporates text from a publication now in the public domain: Healy, Patrick (1912). "Council of Sardica". In Herbermann, Charles (ed.). Catholic Encyclopedia. Vol. 13. New York: Robert Appleton Company.
- Hefele, Karl Josef von (1899). "The Council of Sardica" . In Schaff, Philip; Wace, Henry (eds.). A select library of the Nicene and post-Nicene fathers of the Christian Church. 2. Vol. 14. Translated by Percival, Henry R. (American ed.). Buffalo: Christian Literature – via Wikisource.
- Hess, Hamilton (2002). The early development of Canon law and the Council of Serdica. Oxford [u.a.]: Oxford University Press (published April 2004). doi:10.1093/0198269757.001.0001. ISBN 9780198269755 – via Oxford Scholarship Online.(subscription required)
- Jones, Arnold H. M.; Martindale, John R.; Morris, John, eds. (1971). Prosopography of the Later Roman Empire. Vol. 1. Cambridge [u.a.]: Cambridge University Press. p. 611. ISBN 9780521072335.
- Miller, Molly K.; Behnken, Jacob C.; Metzger, Peter S. A. (2013-04-24). "Council of Serdica (AD 343)". fourthcentury.com. Milwaukee, WI: Wisconsin Lutheran College. Archived from the original on 2015-12-26.
- Mirbt, Carl T. (1911). "Sardica, Council of" . In Chisholm, Hugh (ed.). Encyclopædia Britannica. Vol. 24 (11th ed.). Cambridge University Press. p. 210.
- This article incorporates text from a publication now in the public domain: Myers, Edward (1910). "Hosius of Cordova". In Herbermann, Charles (ed.). Catholic Encyclopedia. Vol. 7. New York: Robert Appleton Company.
- Norton, Peter (22 February 2007). Episcopal Elections 250-600: Hierarchy and Popular Will in Late Antiquity. OUP Oxford. ISBN 978-0-19-152587-2.
- Ohme, Heinz (2012). "Sources of the Greek canon law to the Quinisext Council (691/2): councils and church fathers". In Hartmann, Wilfried; Pennington, Kenneth (eds.). The history of Byzantine and Eastern canon law to 1500. History of medieval canon law. Washington, DC: Catholic University of America Press. pp. 66–74. ISBN 9780813216799.
- Socrates Scholasticus; Zenos, Andrew C. (1890). "Chapter 20" . In Schaff, Philip; Wace, Henry (eds.). A select library of the Nicene and post-Nicene fathers of the Christian Church. 2. Vol. 2 (American ed.). Buffalo: Christian Literature – via Wikisource. Translation taken from Socrates Scholasticus (1844). Ecclesiastical history: a history of the church in seven books. Greek ecclesiastical historians of the first six centuries of the Christian era. Vol. 3. London: Samuel Bagster and Sons. pp. 144–147. OCLC 152444970.
- Stern, Sacha (2001). Calendar and community: a history of the Jewish calendar, second century BCE-tenth century CE. Oxford: Oxford University Press (published November 2003). ISBN 9780198270348 – via Oxford Scholarship Online.(subscription required)
- Stephens, Christopher W. B. (2015). Canon law and episcopal authority: the canons of Antioch and Serdica. Oxford theology and religion monographs. Oxford [u.a.]: Oxford University Press (published June 2015). doi:10.1093/acprof:oso/9780198732228.001.0001. ISBN 9780198732228 – via Oxford Scholarship Online.(subscription required)
- Turner, Cuthbert H., ed. (1930). Ecclesiae occidentalis monumenta iuris antiquissima: canonum et conciliorum Graecorum interpretationes Latinae (in Latin). Vol. Tome 1, fasc. 2, pt. 3. Oxford: Clarendon Press. OCLC 491256393.
