= Hebrew calendar =

Lunisolar calendar used for Jewish religious observances

Today (at UTC+00)
- Tuesday, 10 November 2026
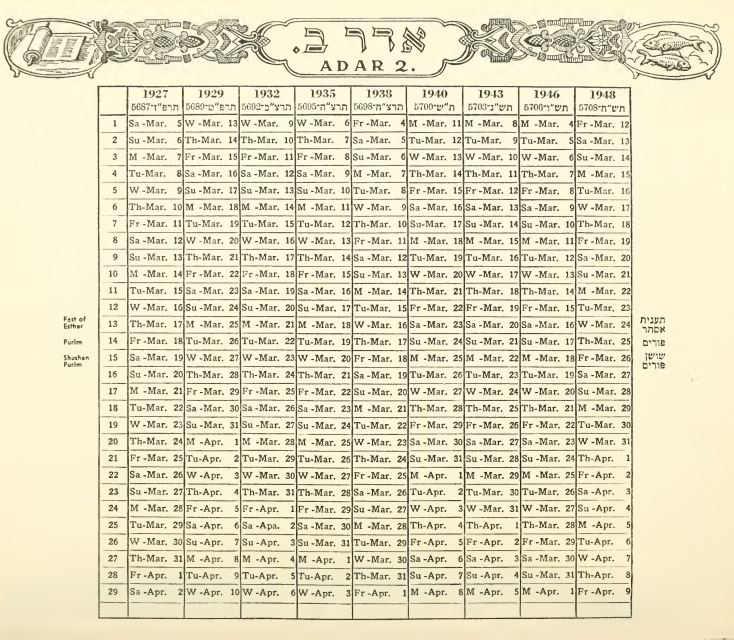
- Jewish calendar, showing Adar II between 1927 and 1948
- Hebrew: 30 Cheshvan, AM 5787
Other calendars
Akan	Kurubene
Armenian	23 Trē 1476
Aztec	Atlcahualo 19, 6 Malīnalli
Babylonian	28 Tashritu, 2337 SE
Balinese pawukon	Menga, Pasah, Laba, Umanis, Paniron, Anggara of Landep, Indra, Urungan, Dewa
Bengali	25 Kartik, BS 1433
Chinese	Yang Earth Rat・Wings Mansion; Fire Horse Year, Month 10, Day 2 (Lidong, 12 days until Xiaoxue)
Common Era	10 November 2026 CE
Coptic	1 Hathor, AM 1743
Egyptian	28 Phamenoth, 2775 NE
Ethiopian	1 H̱edār, 2019 Amätä Məhrät
French Republican	Décade II, Nonidi de Brumaire de l'Année 235 de la République
Gregorian	10 November, AD 2026
Hindu	Viśākhā・Saubhāgya; Solar: 24 Kārtika, 1948 SE; Lunisolar: Pratipada, Śukla pakṣa of Kārtika, 2083 VE; Rāudra・5127 KY・1,872,889
Icelandic	Þriðjudagur, 18 Gormánuður 2026
Islamic	29 Jumada al-awwal, AH 1448 (using tabular method)
ISO week date	2026-W46-2
Japanese	2 Kannazuki, Reiwa 8 (Rittō, 12 days until Shōsetsu)
Julian	28 October, AD 2026 (AM 7535)
Julian day	2461355
Korean	2 Dwaejidal, 4359 DE
Maya	13.0.14.1.12; 5 Ceh, 6 Eb
Roman	ante diem V Kalendas Novembres, MMDCCLXXIX AUC
Solar Hijri	19 Aban, SH 1405
Tibetan	1 smin drug, me pho rta 2153 or 1772 or 1000

The Hebrew calendar (Hebrew: הַלּוּחַ הָעִבְרִי, romanized: HaLuakh ha'Ivri, IPA: [ha‿ˈluaχ ha‿ʔivˈʁi]), also called the Jewish calendar, is a lunisolar calendar used today for Jewish religious observance and as an official calendar of Israel. It determines the dates of Jewish holidays and other rituals, such as yahrzeits, and the scheduling of public Torah readings. In Israel, it is used for religious and agriculture purposes, and is also an official calendar for civil holidays alongside the Gregorian calendar.

Like other lunisolar calendars, the Hebrew calendar consists of months of 29 or 30 days that begin and end at approximately the time of the new moon. As 12 such months comprise a total of just 354 days, an extra lunar month is added every 2 or 3 years so that the long-term average year length closely approximates the actual length of the solar year.

Originally, the beginning of each month was determined based on physical observation of a new moon, while the decision of whether to add the leap month was based on observation of natural agriculture-related events in ancient Israel. Between the years 70 and 1178, these empirical criteria were gradually replaced with a set of mathematical rules. Month length now follows a fixed schedule that is adjusted based on the molad interval (a mathematical approximation of the mean time between new moons) and several other rules, while leap months are now added in 7 out of every 19 years according to the Metonic cycle.

Nowadays, Hebrew years are generally counted according to the system of Anno Mundi (Latin: "in the year of the world"; Hebrew: מבריאת העולם, "from the creation of the world", abbreviated AM) according to traditional Jewish interpretation of the chronology of the Hebrew Bible. This system attempts to calculate the number of years since the creation of the world according to the Genesis creation narrative. The current Hebrew year, AM 5787, began at sunset on 11 September 2026 and will end at sunset on 1 October 2027. (Note: This and certain other calculations in this article are now provided by a template ({{Hebrew year/rhdatum}}). This template is mainly sourced from http://www.hebcal.com, though the information is widely available.)

== Components ==
=== Hours ===
Judaism uses multiple systems for dividing hours. In one system, the 24-hour day is divided into fixed hours equal to 1/24 of a day, while each hour is divided into 1080 halakim (parts, singular: helek). A helek is 3 1/3 seconds (1/18 minute). The ultimate ancestor of the helek was a Babylonian unit of time called a barleycorn, equal to 1/72 of a Babylonian time degree (1° of celestial rotation). These measures are not generally used for everyday purposes; their best-known use is for calculating and announcing the molad.

In another system, the daytime period is divided into 12 relative hours (sha'ah z'manit, also sometimes called "halachic hours"). A relative hour is defined as 1/12 of the time from sunrise to sunset, or dawn to dusk, as per the two opinions in this regard. Therefore, an hour can be less than 60 minutes in winter, and more than 60 minutes in summer; similarly, the 6th hour ends at solar noon, which generally differs from 12:00. Relative hours are used for the calculation of prayer times (zmanim); for example, the Shema must be recited in the first three relative hours of the day.

Neither system is commonly used in ordinary life; rather, the local civil clock is used. This is even the case for ritual times (e.g. "The latest time to recite Shema today is 9:38 AM").

=== Days ===
Based on the classic rabbinic interpretation of Genesis 1:5 ("There was evening and there was morning, one day"), a day in the rabbinic Hebrew calendar runs from sunset (the start of "the evening") to the next sunset. Similarly, Yom Kippur, Passover, and Shabbat are described in the Bible as lasting "from evening to evening". The days are therefore figured locally.

Halachically, the exact time when days begin or end is uncertain: this time could be either sundown (shekiah) or else nightfall (tzait ha'kochavim, "when the stars appear"). The time between sundown and nightfall (bein hashmashot) is of uncertain status. Thus (for example) observance of Shabbat begins before sundown on Friday and ends after nightfall on Saturday, to be sure that Shabbat is not violated no matter when the transition between days occurs.

Instead of the International Date Line convention, there are varying opinions as to where the day changes. (See International date line in Judaism.)

=== Weeks ===
The Hebrew week (שבוע, shavua) is a cycle of seven days, mirroring the seven-day period of the Book of Genesis in which the world is created.

The names for the days of the week are simply the day number within the week. The week begins with Day 1 (Sunday) and ends with Shabbat (Saturday). (More precisely, since days begin in the evening, weeks begin and end on Saturday evening. Day 1 lasts from Saturday evening to Sunday evening, while Shabbat lasts from Friday evening to Saturday evening.)

Since some calculations use division, a remainder of 0 signifies Saturday.

In Hebrew, these names may be abbreviated using the numerical value of the Hebrew letters, for example יום א׳ (Day 1, or Yom Rishon (יום ראשון)):

Hebrew name	Abbreviation	Translation	English equivalent
Yom Rishon (יום ראשון)	יום א'	First day	Sunset on Saturday to sunset on Sunday
Yom Sheni (יום שני)	יום ב'	Second day	Sunset on Sunday to sunset on Monday
Yom Shlishi (יום שלישי)	יום ג'	Third day	Sunset on Monday to sunset on Tuesday
Yom Revii (יום רביעי)	יום ד'	Fourth day	Sunset on Tuesday to sunset on Wednesday
Yom Hamishi (יום חמישי)	יום ה'	Fifth day	Sunset on Wednesday to sunset on Thursday
Yom Shishi (יום שישי)	יום ו'	Sixth day	Sunset on Thursday to sunset on Friday
Yom Shabbat (יום שבת)	יום ש'	Sabbath day	Sunset on Friday to sunset on Saturday

The names of the days of the week are modeled on the seven days mentioned in the Genesis creation account. For example, Genesis 1:8 "... And there was evening and there was morning, a second day" corresponds to Yom Sheni meaning "second day". (However, for days 1, 6, and 7, the modern name differs slightly from the version in Genesis.)

The seventh day, Shabbat, as its Hebrew name indicates, is a day of rest in Judaism. In Talmudic Hebrew, the word Shabbat (שַׁבָּת) can also mean "week", so that in ritual liturgy a phrase like "Yom Reviʻi beShabbat" means "the fourth day in the week".

==== Days of week of holidays ====
Jewish holidays can only fall on the weekdays shown in the following table:

Purim	Passover (first day)	Shavuot (first day)	17 Tammuz/ Tisha B'Av	Rosh Hashanah/ Sukkot/ Shmini Atzeret (first day)	Yom Kippur	Chanukah (first day)	10 Tevet	Tu Bishvat	Purim Katan (only in leap years)
Thu	Sat	Sun	Sun*	Mon	Wed	Sun or Mon	Sun or Tue	Sat or Mon	Sun or Tue
Fri	Sun	Mon	Sun	Tue	Thu	Mon	Tue	Mon	Tue
Sun	Tue	Wed	Tue	Thu	Sat	Wed or Thu	Wed, Thu, or Fri	Tue, Wed, or Thu	Wed or Fri
Tue	Thu	Fri	Thu	Sat	Mon	Fri or Sat	Fri or Sun	Thu or Sat	Fri or Sun
*Postponed from Shabbat

The period from 1 Adar (or Adar II, in leap years) to 29 Marcheshvan contains all of the festivals specified in the Bible (Purim, Passover, Shavuot, Rosh Hashanah, Yom Kippur, Sukkot, and Shemini Atzeret). The lengths of months in this period are fixed, meaning that the day of week of Passover dictates the day of week of the other Biblical holidays. However, the lengths of the months of Marcheshvan and Kislev can each vary by a day (due to the Rosh Hashanah postponement rules, which are used to adjust the year length). As a result, the holidays falling after Marcheshvan (starting with Chanukah) can fall on multiple days for a given row of the table.

A common mnemonic is "לא אד"ו ראש, ולא בד"ו פסח", meaning: "Rosh HaShana cannot be on Sunday, Wednesday or Friday, and Passover cannot be on Monday, Wednesday or Friday" with each day's numerical equivalent, in gematria, is used, such that א' = 1 = Sunday, and so forth. From this rule, every other date can be calculated by adding weeks and days until that date's possible day of the week can be derived.

=== Months ===
The Hebrew calendar is a lunisolar calendar, meaning that months are based on lunar months, but years are based on solar years. (Note: In contrast, the Gregorian calendar is a pure solar calendar, while the Islamic calendar is a pure lunar calendar.) The calendar year features twelve lunar months of 29 or 30 days, with an additional intercalary lunar month added periodically to synchronize the twelve lunar cycles with the longer solar year. These extra months are added in seven years (3, 6, 8, 11, 14, 17, and 19) out of a 19-year cycle, known as the Metonic cycle (See Leap months, below).

The beginning of each Jewish lunar month is based on the appearance of the new moon. Although originally the new lunar crescent had to be observed and certified by witnesses (as is still done in Karaite Judaism and Islam), nowadays Jewish months have generally fixed lengths that approximate the period between new moons. For these reasons, a given month does not always begin on the same day as its astronomical conjunction.

The mean period of the lunar month (precisely, the synodic month) is very close to 29.5 days. Accordingly, the basic Hebrew calendar year is one of twelve lunar months alternating between 29 and 30 days:

Month number (Note: For the distinction between numbering systems, see § New year)		Hebrew month	Length	Range of possible Gregorian dates (Note: Valid at least for 1999–2050. In other years, the ranges for Kislev through Adar I may be a bit wider. After 2089, the earliest date for most months will be one day later; and, from 2214, the last date will be one day later.)	
Biblical / after Exodus	Civil / currently used	Hebrew month	Length	First day	Last day
1	7	Nisan	30	12 March to 11 April	10 April to 10 May
2	8	Iyar	29	11 April to 11 May	9 May to 8 June
3	9	Sivan	30	10 May to 9 June	8 June to 8 July
4	10	Tammuz	29	9 June to 9 July	7 July to 6 August
5	11	Av	30	8 July to 7 August	6 August to 5 September
6	12	Elul	29	7 August to 6 September	4 September to 4 October
7	1	Tishrei	30	5 September to 5 October	4 October to 3 November
8	2	Cheshvan (or Marcheshvan)	29 (or 30)	5 October to 4 November	3 November to 2 December
9	3	Kislev	30 (or 29)	4 November to 3 December	2 December to 31 December
10	4	Tevet	29	3 December to 1 January	1 January to 29 January
11	5	Shevat	30	1 January to 30 January	30 January to 28 February
12	6	Adar I (this is added only in leap years)	30	31 January to 12 February	1 March to 12 March
12	6	Adar (this is called Adar II in leap years)	29	11 February to 13 March	11 March to 10 April
Total			354 (or 353 or 355) 30 days more in leap years		

Thus, the year normally contains twelve months with a total of 354 days. In such a year, the month of Marcheshvan has 29 days and Kislev has 30 days. However, due to the Rosh Hashanah postponement rules, in some years Kislev may lose a day to have 29 days, or Marcheshvan may acquire an additional day to have 30 days.

Normally the 12th month is named Adar. During leap years, the 12th and 13th months are named Adar I and Adar II (Hebrew: Adar Aleph and Adar Bet—"first Adar" and "second adar"). Sources disagree as to which of these months is the "real" Adar, and which is the added leap month.

==== Justification for leap months ====
The Bible does not directly mention the addition of leap months (also known as "embolismic" or "intercalary" months). The insertion of the leap month is based on the requirement that Passover occur at the same time of year as the spring barley harvest (aviv). (Since 12 lunar months make up less than a solar year, the date of Passover would gradually move throughout the solar year if leap months were not occasionally added.) According to the rabbinic calculation, this requirement means that Passover (or at least most of Passover) should fall after the March equinox. Similarly, the holidays of Shavuot and Sukkot are presumed by the Torah to fall in specific agricultural seasons.

Maimonides, discussing the calendrical rules in his Mishneh Torah (1178), notes:

By how much does the solar year exceed the lunar year? By approximately 11 days. Therefore, whenever this excess accumulates to about 30 days, or a little more or less, one month is added and the particular year is made to consist of 13 months, and this is the so-called embolismic (intercalated) year. For the year could not consist of twelve months plus so-and-so many days, since it is said: "throughout the months of the year", which implies that we should count the year by months and not by days.

Year 5787 since the creation of the world,
according to the traditional count.
- This year has 385 days,
  making it a full (שלמה) year.
- In 5787, Rosh Hashanah is on Saturday,
  while Passover is on Thursday
According to the Machzor Katan, the 19-year (Metonic) cycle used to keep the Hebrew calendar aligned with the solar year:
- This year is the 11th year of the 305th cycle.
  It is a leap year.
According to the Machzor Gadol, a 28-year solar cycle used to calculate the date to recite Birkat Hachama, a blessing on the sun:
- This year is the 19th year of the 207th cycle.
According to the current reckoning of sabbatical (shmita) years:
- This year is the 5th year of the cycle.
- It is a maaser sheni year.

=== Years ===
==== New year ====
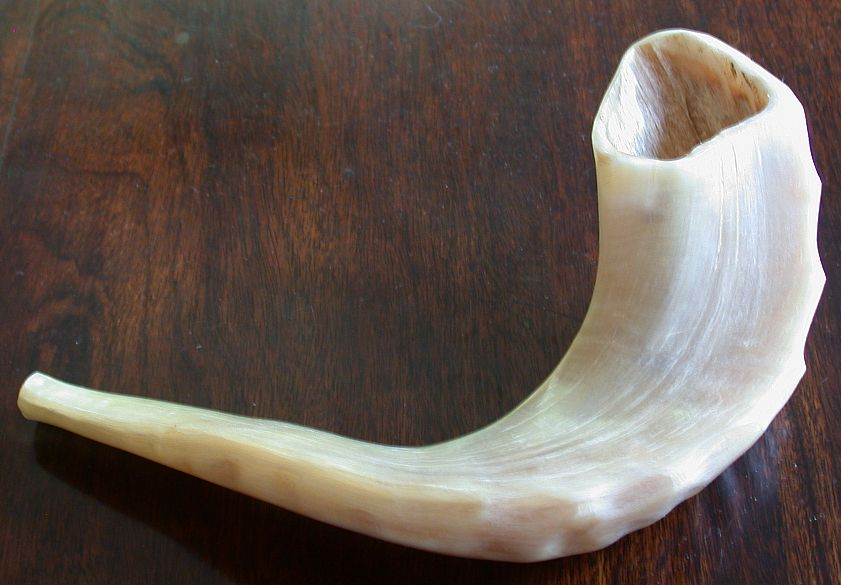
A shofar made from a ram's horn is traditionally blown in observance of Rosh Hashanah, the beginning of the Jewish civic year.

The Hebrew calendar year conventionally begins on Rosh Hashanah, the first day of Tishrei. However, the Jewish calendar also defines several additional new years, used for different purposes. The use of multiple starting dates for a year is comparable to different starting dates for civil "calendar years", "tax or fiscal years", "academic years", and so on. The Mishnah (c. 200 CE) identifies four new-year dates:

The 1st of Nisan is the new year for kings and festivals. The 1st of Elul is the new year for the cattle tithe, Rabbi Eliezer and Rabbi Shimon say on the first of Tishrei. The 1st of Tishri is the new year for years, of the Shmita and Jubilee years, for planting and for vegetables. The 1st of Shevat is the new year for trees—so the school of Shammai, but the school of Hillel say: On the 15th thereof.

Two of these dates are especially prominent:

- 1 Nisan is the ecclesiastical new year, i.e. the date from which months and festivals are counted. Thus Passover (which begins on 15 Nisan) is described in the Torah as falling "in the first month", while Rosh Hashana (which begins on 1 Tishrei) is described as falling "in the seventh month".
- 1 Tishrei is the civil new year, and the date on which the year number advances. This date is known as Rosh Hashanah (lit. 'head of the year'). Tishrei marks the end of one agricultural year and the beginning of another, and thus 1 Tishrei is considered the new year for most agriculture-related commandments, including Shmita, Yovel, Maaser Rishon, Maaser Sheni, and Maaser Ani.

==== Anno Mundi ====
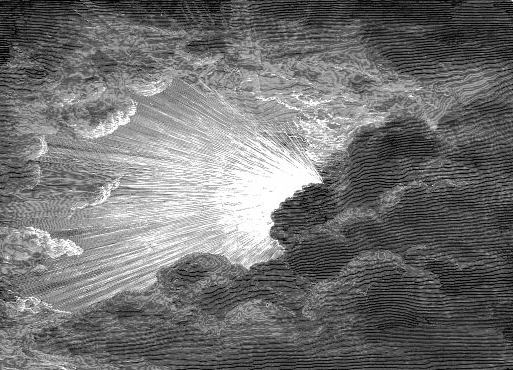
The Jewish calendar's reference point is traditionally held to be about one year before the Creation of the world.

The Jewish year number is generally given by Anno Mundi (from Latin "in the year of the world", often abbreviated AM or A.M.). In this calendar era, the year number equals the number of years that have passed since the creation of the world, according to an interpretation of Biblical accounts of the creation and subsequent history. From the eleventh century, anno mundi dating became the dominant method of counting years throughout most of the world's Jewish communities, replacing earlier systems such as the Seleucid era. As with Anno Domini (A.D. or AD), the words or abbreviation for Anno Mundi (A.M. or AM) for the era should properly precede the date rather than follow it.

The reference junction of the Sun and the Moon (Molad 1) is considered to be at 5 hours and 204 halakim, or 11:11:20 pm, on the evening of Sunday, 6 October 3761 BCE. According to rabbinic reckoning, this moment was not Creation, but about one year "before" Creation, with the new moon of its first month (Tishrei) called molad tohu (the mean new moon of chaos or nothing). It is about one year before the traditional Jewish date of Creation on 25 Elul AM 1, (Note: The significance of 25 Elul derives from Adam and Eve being created on the sixth day of creation, 1 Tishrei AM 2. In this view, AM 2 is the actual first year of the world, while AM 1 is a "placeholder" year, so that calendar dates can be assigned to the days of creation.) based upon the Seder Olam Rabbah. (Note: A minority opinion places Creation on 25 Adar AM 1, six months earlier, or six months after the modern epoch.) Thus, adding 3760 before Rosh Hashanah or 3761 after to a Julian calendar year number starting from 1 CE will yield the Hebrew year. For earlier years there may be a discrepancy; see Missing years (Jewish calendar).

In Hebrew there are two common ways of writing the year number: with the thousands, called לפרט גדול ("major era"), and without the thousands, called לפרט קטן ("minor era"). Thus, the current year is written as ה'תשפ"ז (5787) using the "major era" and תשפ"ז (787) using the "minor era".

==== Cycles of years ====
Since the Jewish calendar has been fixed, leap months have been added according to the Metonic cycle of 19 years, of which 12 are common (non-leap) years of 12 months, and 7 are leap years of 13 months. This 19-year cycle is known in Hebrew as the Machzor Katan ("small cycle").

Because the Julian years are 365 1/4 days long, every 28 years the weekday pattern repeats. This is called the sun cycle, or the Machzor Gadol ("great cycle") in Hebrew. The beginning of this cycle is arbitrary. Its main use is for determining the time of Birkat Hachama.

Because every 50 years is a Jubilee year, there is a jubilee (yovel) cycle. Because every seven years is a sabbatical year, there is a seven-year release cycle. The placement of these cycles is debated. Historically, there is enough evidence to fix the sabbatical years in the Second Temple Period. But it may not match with the sabbatical cycle derived from the biblical period; and there is no consensus on whether the Jubilee year is the fiftieth year or the latter half of the forty ninth year.

Every 247 years, or 13 cycles of 19 years, form a period known as an iggul, or the Iggul of Rabbi Nahshon. This period is notable in that the precise details of the calendar almost always (but not always) repeat over this period. This occurs because the molad interval (the average length of a Hebrew month) is 29.530594 days, which over 247 years results in a total of 90215.965 days. This is almost exactly 90216 days – a whole number and multiple of 7 (equalling the days of the week). So over 247 years, not only does the 19-year leap year cycle repeat itself, but the days of the week (and thus the days of Rosh Hashanah and the year length) typically repeat themselves.

== Calculations ==
=== Leap year calculations ===
To determine whether a Jewish year is a leap year, one must find its position in the 19-year Metonic cycle. This position is calculated by dividing the Jewish year number by 19 and finding the remainder. (Since there is no year 0, a remainder of 0 indicates that the year is year 19 of the cycle.) For example, the Jewish year 5787 divided by 19 results in a remainder of 11, indicating that it is year 11 of the Metonic cycle. The Jewish year used is the anno mundi year, in which the year of creation according to the Rabbinical Chronology (3761 BCE) is taken as year 1. Years 3, 6, 8, 11, 14, 17, and 19 of the Metonic cycle are leap years. The Hebrew mnemonic GUCHADZaT גוחאדז״ט refers to these years, (Note: In which the letters refer to Hebrew numerals equivalent to 3, 6, 8, 1, 4, 7, 9.) while another memory aid refers to musical notation. (Note: Intervals of the major scale follow the same pattern as do Jewish leap years, with do corresponding to year 19 (or 0): a whole step in the scale corresponds to two common years between consecutive leap years, and a half step to one common year between two leap years. This connection with the major scale is more plain in the context of 19 equal temperament: counting the tonic as 0, the notes of the major scale in 19 equal temperament are numbers 0 (or 19), 3, 6, 8, 11, 14, 17, the same numbers as the leap years in the Hebrew calendar.)

Whether a year is a leap year can also be determined by a simple calculation (which also gives the fraction of a month by which the calendar is behind the seasons, useful for agricultural purposes). To determine whether year n of the calendar is a leap year, find the remainder on dividing [(7 × n) + 1] by 19. If the remainder is 6 or less it is a leap year; if it is 7 or more it is not. For example, the remainder on dividing [(7 × 5787) + 1] by 19 is 2, so the year 5787 is a leap year. The remainder on dividing [(7 × 5788) + 1] by 19 is 9, so the year 5788 is not a leap year. This works because as there are seven leap years in nineteen years the difference between the solar and lunar years increases by 7/19 month per year. When the difference goes above 18/19 month this signifies a leap year, and the difference is reduced by one month.

The Hebrew calendar assumes that a month is uniformly of the length of an average synodic month, taken as exactly 29 13753/25920 days (about 29.530594 days, which is less than half a second from the modern scientific estimate); it also assumes that a tropical year is exactly 12 7/19 times that, i.e., about 365.2468 days. Thus, it overestimates the length of the tropical year (365.2422 days) by 0.0046 days (about 7 minutes) per year, or about one day in 216 years. This error is less than the Julian years (365.2500 days) make (0.0078 days/year, or one day in 128 years), but much more than what the Gregorian years (365.2425 days/year) make (0.0003 days/year, or one day in 3333 years).

=== Rosh Hashanah postponement rules ===
Besides the adding of leap months, the year length is sometimes adjusted by adding one day to the month of Marcheshvan, or removing one day from the month of Kislev. Because each calendar year begins with Rosh Hashanah, adjusting the year length is equivalent to moving the day of the next Rosh Hashanah. Several rules are used to determine when this is performed.

To calculate the day on which Rosh Hashanah of a given year will fall, the expected molad (moment of lunar conjunction or new moon) of Tishrei in that year is calculated. The molad is calculated by multiplying the number of months that will have elapsed since some (preceding) molad (whose weekday is known) by the mean length of a (synodic) lunar month, which is 29 days, 12 hours, and 793 parts (there are 1080 "parts" in an hour, so that one part is equal to 3 1/3 seconds). The very first molad, the molad tohu, fell on Sunday evening at 11:11:20 pm in the local time of Jerusalem, (Note: UTC+02:20:56.9) 6 October 3761 BCE (Proleptic Julian calendar) 20:50:23.1 UTC, or in Jewish terms Day 2, 5 hours, and 204 parts. The exact time of a molad in terms of days after midnight between 29 and 30 December 1899 (the form used by many spreadsheets for date and time) is

−2067022 + (23 + 34/3/60)/24 + (29.5 + 793/1080/24)N

where N is the number of lunar months since the beginning. (N = 71440 for the beginning of the 305th Machzor Katan on 3 October 2016.) Adding 0.25 to this converts it to the Jewish system in which the day begins at 6 pm.

In calculating the number of months since the known molad that one uses as the starting point, one must include any leap months that fall within the elapsed interval, according to the cycle of leap years. A 19-year cycle of 235 synodic months has 991 weeks 2 days 16 hours 595 parts, a common year of 12 synodic months has 50 weeks 4 days 8 hours 876 parts, while a leap year of 13 synodic months has 54 weeks 5 days 21 hours 589 parts.

Four conditions are considered to determine whether the date of Rosh Hashanah must be postponed. These are called the Rosh Hashanah postponement rules, or deḥiyyot. The two most important conditions are:

- If the molad occurs at or later than noon, Rosh Hashanah is postponed to the following day. This is called deḥiyyat molad zaken (דְחִיַּת מוֹלָד זָקֵן, literally, "old birth", i.e., late new moon). This rule is mentioned in the Talmud, and is used nowadays to prevent the molad falling on the second day of the month. This ensures that the long-term average month length is 29.530594 days (equal to the molad interval), rather than the 29.5 days implied by the standard alternation between 29- and 30-day months.
- If the molad occurs on a Sunday, Wednesday, or Friday, Rosh Hashanah is postponed to the following day. If the application of deḥiyyah molad zaken would place Rosh Hashanah on one of these days, then it is postponed a second day. This is called deḥiyyat lo ADU (דְחִיַּת לֹא אד״ו), an acronym that means "not [weekday] one, four, or six".

This rule is applied for religious reasons, so that Yom Kippur does not fall on a Friday or Sunday, and Hoshana Rabbah does not fall on Shabbat. (Note: This is the reason given by most halachic authorities, based on the Talmud, Rosh Hashanah 20b and Sukkah 43b. Maimonides (Mishneh Torah, Kiddush Hachodesh 7:7), however, writes that the arrangement was made (possible days alternating with impossible ones) in order to average out the difference between the mean and true lunar conjunctions.) Since Shabbat restrictions also apply to Yom Kippur, if either day falls immediately before the other, it would not be possible to make necessary preparations for the second day (such as candle lighting). (Note: The Talmud (Rosh Hashanah 20b) puts it differently: over two consecutive days of full Shabbat restrictions, vegetables would wilt (since they cannot be cooked), and unburied corpses would putrefy.) Additionally, the laws of Shabbat override those of Hoshana Rabbah, so that if Hoshana Rabbah were to fall on Shabbat, the Hoshana Rabbah aravah ritual could not be performed.

Thus, Rosh Hashanah can only fall on Monday, Tuesday, Thursday, and Saturday. The kevi'ah uses the letters ה ,ג ,ב and ז (representing 2, 3, 5, and 7, for Monday, Tuesday, Thursday, and Saturday) to denote the starting day of Rosh Hashana and the year.

Two other rules are applied much less frequently and serve to prevent impermissible year lengths. Their names are Hebrew acronyms that refer to the ways they are calculated:

- If the molad in a common year falls on a Tuesday, on or after 9 hours and 204 parts, Rosh Hashanah is postponed to Thursday. This is deḥiyyat GaTaRaD (דְחִיַּת גטר״ד, where the acronym stands for "3 [Tuesday], 9, 204").
- If the molad following a leap year falls on a Monday, on or after 15 hours and 589 parts after the Hebrew day began (for calculation purposes, this is taken to be 6 pm Sunday), Rosh Hashanah is postponed to Tuesday. This is deḥiyyat BeTUTeKaPoT (דְחִיַּת בט״ו תקפ״ט), where the acronym stands for "2 [Monday], 15, 589".

=== Deficient, regular, and complete years ===
The rules of postponement of Rosh HaShanah make it that a Jewish common year will have 353, 354, or 355 days while a leap year (with the addition of Adar I which always has 30 days) has 383, 384, or 385 days.

- A chaserah year (Hebrew for "deficient" or "incomplete") is 353 or 383 days long. Both Cheshvan and Kislev have 29 days.
- A kesidrah year ("regular" or "in-order") is 354 or 384 days long. Cheshvan has 29 days while Kislev has 30 days.
- A shlemah year ("complete" or "perfect", also "abundant") is 355 or 385 days long. Both Cheshvan and Kislev have 30 days.

Whether a year is deficient, regular, or complete is determined by the time between two adjacent Rosh Hashanah observances and the leap year.

A Metonic cycle equates to 235 lunar months in each 19-year cycle. This gives an average of 6,939 days, 16 hours, and 595 parts for each cycle. But due to the Rosh Hashanah postponement rules (preceding section) a cycle of 19 Jewish years can be either 6,939, 6,940, 6,941, or 6,942 days in duration. For any given year in the Metonic cycle, the molad moves forward in the week by 2 days, 16 hours, and 595 parts every 19 years. The greatest common divisor of this and a week is 5 parts, so the Jewish calendar repeats exactly following a number of Metonic cycles equal to the number of parts in a week divided by 5, namely 7×24×216 = 36,288 Metonic cycles, or 689,472 Jewish years. There is a near-repetition every 247 years, except for an excess of 50 minutes 16 2/3 seconds (905 parts).

Contrary to popular impression, one's Hebrew birthday does not necessarily fall on the same Gregorian date every 19 years, since the length of the Metonic cycle varies by several days (as does the length of a 19-year Gregorian period, depending whether it contains 4 or 5 leap years).

=== Kevi'ah ===
Days in year →	353	354	355	383	384	385
Day of Rosh HaShanah	English Kevi'ah symbol					
Monday (2)	2D3		2C5	2D5		2C7
Tuesday (3)		3R5			3R7	
Thursday (5)		5R7	5C1	5D1		5C3
Saturday (7)	7D1		7C3	7D3		7C5

There are three qualities that distinguish one year from another: whether it is a leap year or a common year; on which of four permissible days of the week the year begins; and whether it is a deficient, regular, or complete year. Mathematically, there are 24 (2×4×3) possible combinations, but only 14 of them are valid.

Each of these patterns is known by a kevi'ah (Hebrew: קביעה for 'a setting' or 'an established thing'), which is a code consisting of two numbers and a letter. In English, the code consists of the following:

- The left number is the day of the week of 1 Tishrei, Rosh Hashanah (2 3 5 7; Hebrew: ב ג ה ז)
- The letter indicates whether that year is deficient (D, "ח", from Hebrew: חסרה, romanized: Chasera), regular (R, "כ", from Hebrew: כסדרה, romanized: Kesidra), or complete (C, "ש", from Hebrew: שלמה, romanized: Shlema)
- The right number is the day of the week of 15 Nisan, the first day of Passover or Pesach (1 3 5 7; Hebrew: א ג ה ז), within the same Hebrew year (next Julian/Gregorian year)

The kevi'ah in Hebrew letters is written right-to-left, so their days of the week are reversed, the right number for 1 Tishrei and the left for 15 Nisan.

The kevi'ah also determines the Torah reading cycle (which parshiyot are read together or separately.

=== The four gates ===
The kevi'ah, and thus the annual calendar, of a numbered Hebrew year can be determined by consulting the table of Four Gates, whose inputs are the year's position in the 19-year cycle and its molad Tishrei. (Note: In the Four Gates sources (kevi'ot cited here are in Hebrew in sources except al-Biruni): al-Biruni specified 5R (5 Intermediate) instead of 5D in leap years. Bushwick forgot to include 5D for leap years. Poznanski forgot to include 5D for a limit in his table although he did include it in his text as 5D1; for leap years he incorrectly listed 5C7 instead of the correct 5C3. Resnikoff's table is correct.) In this table, the years of a 19-year cycle are organized into four groups (called "gates"): common years after a leap year but before a common year (1 4 9 12 15); common years between two leap years (7 18); common years after a common year but before a leap year (2 5 10 13 16); and leap years (3 6 8 11 14 17 19).

This table numbers the days of the week and hours for the limits of molad Tishrei in the Hebrew manner for calendrical calculations, that is, both begin at 6 pm, thus 7d 18h 0p is noon Saturday, with the week starting on 1d 0h 0p (Saturday 6 pm, i.e. the beginning of Sunday reckoned in the Hebrew manner). The oldest surviving table of Four Gates was written by Muhammad ibn Musa al-Khwarizmi in 824.

Four gates or Table of Limits
molad Tishrei ≥	Year of 19-year cycle
molad Tishrei ≥	1 4 9 12 15	7 18	2 5 10 13 16	3 6 8 11 14 17 19
7d 18h 0p		2D3 בחג		2D5 בחה
1d 9h 204p
1d 20h 491p		2C5 בשה		2C7 בשז
2d 15h 589p
2d 18h 0p		3R5 גכה		3R7 גכז
3d 9h 204p		5R7 הכז
3d 18h 0p		5R7 הכז		5D1 החא
4d 11h 695p		5R7 הכז
5d 9h 204p		5C1 השא		5C3 השג
5d 18h 0p
6d 0h 408p		7D1 זחא		7D3 זחג
6d 9h 204p
6d 20h 491p		7C3 זשג		7C5 זשה

==== Incidence ====
Comparing the days of the week of molad Tishrei with those in the kevi'ah shows that during 39% of years 1 Tishrei is not postponed beyond the day of the week of its molad Tishrei, 47% are postponed one day, and 14% are postponed two days. This table also identifies the seven types of common years and seven types of leap years. Most are represented in any 19-year cycle, except one or two may be in neighboring cycles. The most likely type of year is 5R7 in 18.1% of years, whereas the least likely is 5C1 in 3.3% of years. The day of the week of 15 Nisan is later than that of 1 Tishrei by one, two or three days for common years and three, four or five days for leap years in deficient, regular or complete years, respectively.

Incidence (percentage)
common years		leap years	
5R7	18.05	5C3	6.66
7C3	13.72	7D3	5.8
2C5	11.8	2D5	5.8
3R5	6.25	3R7	5.26
2D3	5.71	2C7	4.72
7D1	4.33	7C5	4.72
5C1	3.31	5D1	3.87

=== Worked example ===
Given the length of the year, the length of each month is fixed as described above, so the real problem in determining the calendar for a year is determining the number of days in the year. In the modern calendar, this is determined in the following manner. (Note: The following description is based on the article "Calendar" in Encyclopaedia Judaica (Jerusalem: Ketter, 1972). It is an explanatory description, not a procedural one, in particular explaining what is going on with the third and fourth deḥiyyot)

The day of Rosh Hashanah and the length of the year are determined by the time and the day of the week of the Tishrei molad, that is, the moment of the average conjunction. Given the Tishrei molad of a certain year, the length of the year is determined as follows:

First, one must determine whether each year is an ordinary or leap year by its position in the 19-year Metonic cycle. Years 3, 6, 8, 11, 14, 17, and 19 are leap years.

Secondly, one must determine the number of days between the starting Tishrei molad (TM1) and the Tishrei molad of the next year (TM2). For calendar descriptions in general the day begins at 6 pm, but for the purpose of determining Rosh Hashanah, a molad occurring on or after noon is treated as belonging to the next day (the first deḥiyyah). (Note: So for example if the Tishrei molad is calculated as occurring from noon on Wednesday (the 18th hour of the fourth day) up until noon on Thursday, Rosh Hashanah falls on a Thursday, which starts Wednesday at sunset wherever one happens to be.) All months are calculated as 29d, 12h, 44m, 3 1/3s long (MonLen). Therefore, in an ordinary year TM2 occurs 12 × MonLen days after TM1. This is usually 354 calendar days after TM1, but if TM1 is on or after 3:11:20 am and before noon, it will be 355 days. Similarly, in a leap year, TM2 occurs 13 × MonLen days after TM1. This is usually 384 days after TM1, but if TM1 is on or after noon and before 2:27:16 2/3 pm, TM2 will be only 383 days after TM1. In the same way, from TM2 one calculates TM3. Thus the four natural year lengths are 354, 355, 383, and 384 days.

However, because of the holiday rules, Rosh Hashanah cannot fall on a Sunday, Wednesday, or Friday, so if TM2 is one of those days, Rosh Hashanah in year 2 is postponed by adding one day to year 1 (the second deḥiyyah). To compensate, one day is subtracted from year 2. It is to allow for these adjustments that the system allows 385-day years (long leap) and 353-day years (short ordinary) besides the four natural year lengths.

But how can year 1 be lengthened if it is already a long ordinary year of 355 days or year 2 be shortened if it is a short leap year of 383 days? That is why the third and fourth deḥiyyahs are needed.

If year 1 is already a long ordinary year of 355 days, there will be a problem if TM1 is on a Tuesday, (Note: This will happen if TM1 is on or after 3:11:20 am and before noon on a Tuesday. If TM1 is Monday, Thursday or Saturday, Rosh Hashanah in year 2 does not need to be postponed. If TM1 is Sunday, Wednesday or Friday, Rosh Hashanah in year 1 is postponed, so year 1 is not the maximum length.) as that means TM2 falls on a Sunday and will have to be postponed, creating a 356-day year. In this case, Rosh Hashanah in year 1 is postponed from Tuesday (the third deḥiyyah). As it cannot be postponed to Wednesday, it is postponed to Thursday, and year 1 ends up with 354 days.

On the other hand, if year 2 is already a short year of 383 days, there will be a problem if TM2 is on a Wednesday. (Note: TM2 will be between noon and 2:27:16 2/3 pm on Tuesday, and TM3 will be between 9:32:43 1/3 and noon on Monday.) because Rosh Hashanah in year 2 will have to be postponed from Wednesday to Thursday and this will cause year 2 to be only 382 days long. In this case, year 2 is extended by one day by postponing Rosh Hashanah in year 3 from Monday to Tuesday (the fourth deḥiyyah), and year 2 will have 383 days.

== Accuracy ==
=== Molad interval ===
A "new moon" (astronomically called a lunar conjunction and, in Hebrew, a molad) is the moment at which the sun and moon have the same ecliptic longitude (i.e. they are aligned horizontally with respect to a north–south line). The period between two new moons is a synodic month. The actual length of a synodic month varies from about 29 days 6 hours and 30 minutes (29.27 days) to about 29 days and 20 hours (29.83 days), a variation range of about 13 hours and 30 minutes. Accordingly, for convenience, the Hebrew calendar uses a long-term average month length, known as the molad interval, which equals the mean synodic month of ancient times. The molad interval is 29 days, 12 hours, and 793 "parts" (1 "part" = ^{1}/_{18} minute = 3^{1}/_{3} seconds) (i.e., 29.530594 days), and is the same value determined by the Babylonians in their System B about 300 BCE and was adopted by Hipparchus (2nd century BCE) and by Ptolemy in the Almagest (2nd century CE). Its remarkable accuracy (less than one second from the current true value) is thought to have been achieved using records of lunar eclipses from the 8th to 5th centuries BCE. In the Talmudic era, when the mean synodic month was slightly shorter than at present, the molad interval was even more accurate, being "essentially a perfect fit" for the mean synodic month at the time.

Currently, the accumulated drift in the moladot since the Talmudic era has reached a total of approximately 97 minutes. This means that the molad of Tishrei lands one day later than it ought to in (97 minutes) ÷ (1440 minutes per day) = nearly 7% of years. Therefore, the seemingly small drift of the moladot is already significant enough to affect the date of Rosh Hashanah, which then cascades to many other dates in the calendar year, and sometimes (due to the Rosh Hashanah postponement rules) also interacts with the dates of the prior or next year.

The rate of calendar drift is increasing with time, since the mean synodic month is progressively shortening due to gravitational tidal effects. Measured on a strictly uniform time scale (such as that provided by an atomic clock) the mean synodic month is becoming gradually longer, but since the tides slow Earth's rotation rate even more, the mean synodic month is becoming gradually shorter in terms of mean solar time.

=== Metonic cycle drift ===
A larger source of error is the inaccuracy of the Metonic cycle. Nineteen Jewish years average 6939d 16h 33m 03 1/3s, compared to the 6939d 14h 26m 15s of nineteen mean solar years. Thus, the Hebrew calendar drifts by just over 2 hours every 19 years, or approximately one day every 216 years. Due to accumulation of this discrepancy, the earliest date on which Passover can fall has drifted by roughly eight days since the 4th century, and the 15th of Nisan now falls only on or after 26 March (the date in 2013), five days after the actual equinox on 21 March. In the distant future, this drift is projected to move Passover much further in the year. If the calendar is not amended, then Passover will start to land on or after the summer solstice around approximately AM 16652 (12892 CE). (Note: The exact year when this will begin to occur depends on uncertainties in the future tidal slowing of the Earth rotation rate, and on the accuracy of predictions of precession and Earth axial tilt.)

=== Implications for Jewish ritual ===
When the calendar was fixed in the 4th century, the earliest Passover (in year 16 of the Metonic cycle) began on the first full moon after the March equinox. (Note: That is to say, Passover began within a day or so of the full moon) This is still the case in about 80% of years; but, in about 20% of years, Passover is a month late by this criterion. (Note: As it was in AM 5765, 5768 and 5776, the 8th, 11th and 19th years of the 19-year cycle = Gregorian 2005, 2008 and 2016 CE.) Presently, this occurs after the "premature" insertion of a leap month in years 8, 11, and 19 of each 19-year cycle, which causes Passover to fall especially far after the March equinox in such years. Calendar drift also impacts the observance of Sukkot, which will shift into Israel's winter rainy season, making dwelling in the sukkah less practical. It also affects the logic of the Shemini Atzeret prayer for rain, which will be more often recited once rains are already underway.

Modern scholars have debated at which point the drift could become ritually problematic, and proposed adjustments to the fixed calendar to keep Passover in its proper season. The seriousness of the calendar drift is discounted by many, on the grounds that Passover will remain in the spring season for many millennia, and the Torah is generally not interpreted as having specified tight calendrical limits. However, some writers and researchers have proposed "corrected" calendars (with modifications to the leap year cycle, molad interval, or both) which would compensate for these issues:

- Irv Bromberg has suggested a 353-year cycle of 4,366 months, which would include 130 leap months, along with use of a progressively shorter molad interval, which would keep an amended fixed arithmetic Hebrew calendar from drifting for more than seven millennia. The 353 years would consist of 18 Metonic cycles, as well as an 11-year period in which the last 8 years of the Metonic cycle are omitted.
- Other authors have proposed to use cycles of 334 or 687 years.
- Another suggestion is to delay the leap years gradually so that a whole intercalary month is taken out at the end of Iggul 26; while also changing the synodic month to be the more accurate 29.53058868 days. Thus, the length of the year would be (235 × 13 × 26 − 1)/(19 × 13 × 26) = 365.2422 days, very close to the actual tropical year. The result is the "Hebrew Calendar" in the program CalMaster2000.

Religious questions abound about how such a system might be implemented and administered throughout the diverse aspects of the world Jewish community.

== Usage ==
=== In Auschwitz ===
While imprisoned in Auschwitz, Jews made every effort to preserve Jewish tradition in the camps, despite the monumental dangers in doing so. The Hebrew calendar, a tradition with great importance to Jewish practice and rituals, was particularly dangerous, since no tools of telling of time, such as watches and calendars, were permitted in the camps. The keeping of a Hebrew calendar was a rarity amongst prisoners and there are only two currently known surviving calendars that were made in Auschwitz, both of which were made by women. Before this, the tradition of making a Hebrew calendar was greatly assumed to be the job of a man in Jewish society.

=== In contemporary Israel ===
Early Zionist pioneers were impressed by the fact that the calendar preserved by Jews over many centuries in far-flung diasporas, as a matter of religious ritual, was geared to the climate of their original country: major Jewish holidays such as Sukkot, Passover, and Shavuot correspond to major points of the country's agricultural year such as planting and harvest. Accordingly, in the early 20th century the Hebrew calendar was re-interpreted as an agricultural rather than religious calendar.

After the creation of the State of Israel, the Hebrew calendar became one of the official calendars of Israel, along with the Gregorian calendar. Holidays and commemorations not derived from previous Jewish tradition were to be fixed according to the Hebrew calendar date. For example, the Israeli Independence Day falls on 5 Iyar, Jerusalem Reunification Day on 28 Iyar, Yom HaAliyah on 10 Nisan, and the Holocaust Commemoration Day on 27 Nisan.

The Hebrew calendar is still widely acknowledged, appearing in public venues such as banks (where it is legal for use on cheques and other documents), and on the mastheads of newspapers.

The Jewish New Year (Rosh Hashanah) is a two-day public holiday in Israel. However, since the 1980s an increasing number of secular Israelis celebrate the Gregorian New Year (usually known as "Silvester Night"—ליל סילבסטר) on the night between 31 December and 1 January. Prominent rabbis have on several occasions sharply denounced this practice, but with no noticeable effect on the secularist celebrants.

Wall calendars commonly used in Israel are hybrids. Most are organised according to Gregorian rather than Jewish months, but begin in September, when the Jewish New Year usually falls, and provide the Jewish date in small characters.

== History ==
=== Early formation ===
Lunisolar calendars similar to the Hebrew calendar, consisting of twelve lunar months plus an occasional 13th intercalary month to synchronize with the solar/agricultural cycle, were used in all ancient Middle Eastern civilizations except Egypt, and likely date to the 3rd millennium BCE. While there is no mention of the intercalary month anywhere in the Hebrew Bible, most Biblical scholars hold that the intercalation process was almost certainly a regularly occurring aspect of the early Hebrew calendar keeping process. The earliest potentially Hebrew calendar found is the Gezer calendar. It is debated among Semiticists whether it is Hebrew, such as "early Samarian Hebrew", or if it is Phoenician. The Gezer calendar is commonly dated to circa 10th century BCE.

=== Month names ===
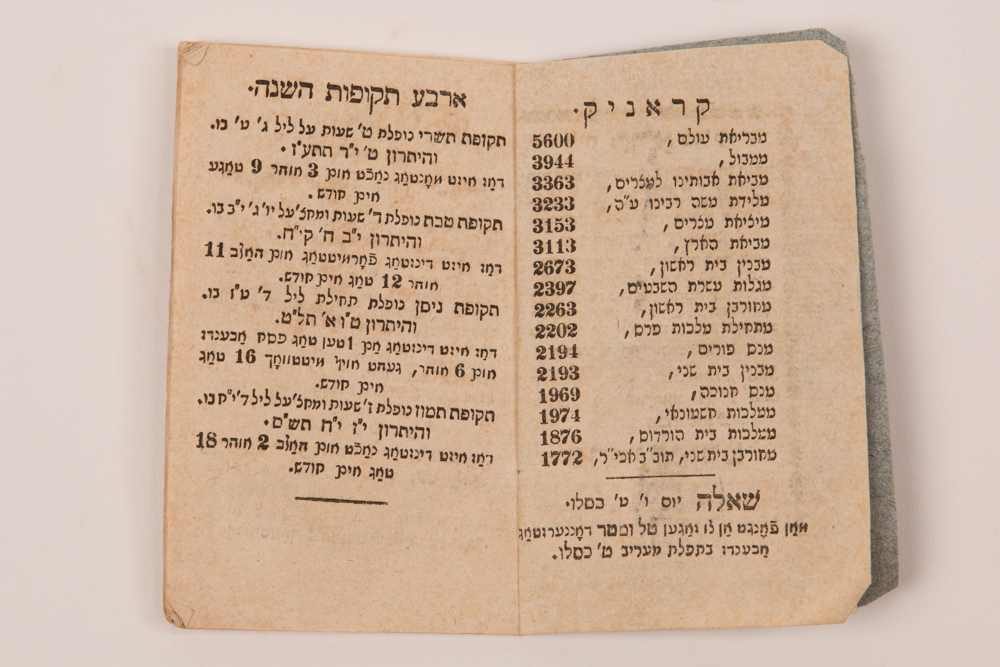
Calendar for the year 1840/41. Printed by I. Lehrberger u. Comp., Rödelheim. In the collection of the Jewish Museum of Switzerland.

Biblical references to the pre-exilic calendar include ten of the twelve months identified by number rather than by name.

Prior to the Babylonian captivity, the names of only four months are referred to in the Tanakh: Aviv (first month), Ziv (second month), Ethanim (seventh month), and Bul (eighth month). All of these are believed to be Canaanite names. The last three of these names are only mentioned in connection with the building of the First Temple and Håkan Ulfgard suggests that the use of what are rarely used Canaanite (or in the case of Ethanim perhaps Northwest Semitic) names indicates that "the author is consciously utilizing an archaizing terminology, thus giving the impression of an ancient story...". Alternatively, these names may be attributed to the presence of Phoenician scribes in Solomon's court at the time of the building of the Temple.

During the Babylonian captivity, the Jewish people adopted the Babylonian names for the months. The Babylonian calendar descended directly from the Sumerian calendar. These Babylonian month-names (such as Nisan, Iyyar, Tammuz, Ab, Elul, Tishri and Adar) are shared with the modern Levantine solar calendar (currently used in the Arabic-speaking countries of the Fertile Crescent) and the modern Assyrian calendar, indicating a common origin. The origin is thought to be the Babylonian calendar.

Hebrew names of the months with their Babylonian analogs
#	Hebrew	Tiberian	Academy	Common/ Other	Length	Babylonian analog	Holidays/ Notable days	Notes
1	נִיסָן	Nīsān	Nisan	Nissan	30 days	Nisanu	Passover	Called Abib and Nisan in the Tanakh.
2	אִיָּר / אִייָר	ʼIyyār	Iyyar	Iyar	29 days	Ayaru	Pesach Sheni; Lag B'Omer	Called Ziv
3	סִיוָן / סיוון	Sīwān	Sivan	Siwan	30 days	Simanu	Shavuot	
4	תַּמּוּז	Tammūz	Tammuz	Tamuz	29 days	Dumuzu	Seventeenth of Tammuz	Named for the Babylonian god Dumuzi
5	אָב	ʼĀḇ	Av	Ab	30 days	Abu	Tisha B'Av; Tu B'Av	
6	אֱלוּל	ʼĔlūl	Elul		29 days	Ululu		
7	תִּשְׁרֵי / תִּשְׁרִי	Tišrī	Tishri	Tishrei	30 days	Tashritu	Rosh Hashanah; Yom Kippur; Sukkot; Shemini Atzeret; Simchat Torah	Called Ethanim in Kings 8:2. First month of civil year.
8	מַרְחֶשְׁוָן / מרחשוון	Marḥešwān	Marẖeshvan	Marcheshvan; Cheshvan; Marẖeshwan	29 or 30 days	Arakhsamna		Called Bul in Kings 6:38.
9	כִּסְלֵו / כסליו	Kislēw	Kislev	Kislev; Chisleu; Chislev	29 or 30 days	Kislimu	Hanukkah	
10	טֵבֵת	Ṭēḇēṯ	Tevet	Tebeth	29 days	Tebetu	Tenth of Tevet	Called Tebeth in Esther 2:16.
11	שְׁבָט	Šəḇāṭ	Shvat	Shevat; Shebat; Sebat	30 days	Shabatu	Tu Bishvat	
12L^{*}	אֲדָר א׳		Adar I^{*}		30 days			^{*}Only in Leap years.
12	אֲדָר / אֲדָר ב׳*	ʼĂḏār	Adar / Adar II^{*}		29 days	Adaru	Purim	^{*}Only in Leap years.

=== Past methods of dividing years ===
According to some Christian and Karaite sources, the tradition in ancient Israel was that 1 Nisan would not start until the barley is ripe, being the test for the onset of spring. (Note: The barley had to be "eared out" (ripe) in order to have a wave-sheaf offering of the first fruits according to the Law.) If the barley was not ripe, an intercalary month would be added before Nisan.

In the 1st century, Josephus stated that while:

Moses...appointed Nisan...as the first month for the festivals...the commencement of the year for everything relating to divine worship, but for selling and buying and other ordinary affairs he preserved the ancient order [i. e. the year beginning with Tishrei].

Edwin Thiele concluded that the ancient northern Kingdom of Israel counted years using the ecclesiastical new year starting on 1 Aviv/Nisan (Nisan-years), while the southern Kingdom of Judah counted years using the civil new year starting on 1 Tishrei (Tishri-years). The practice of the Kingdom of Israel was also that of Babylon, as well as other countries of the region. The practice of Judah is continued in modern Judaism and is celebrated as Rosh Hashana.

=== Past methods of numbering years ===
Before the adoption of the current Anno Mundi year numbering system, other systems were used. In early times, the years were counted from some significant event such as the Exodus. During the period of the monarchy, it was the widespread practice in western Asia to use era year numbers according to the accession year of the monarch of the country involved. This practice was followed by the united kingdom of Israel, kingdom of Judah, kingdom of Israel, Persia, and others. Besides, the author of Kings coordinated dates in the two kingdoms by giving the accession year of a monarch in terms of the year of the monarch of the other kingdom, though some commentators note that these dates do not always synchronise. Other era dating systems have been used at other times. For example, Jewish communities in the Babylonian diaspora counted the years from the first deportation from Israel, that of Jehoiachin in 597 BCE. The era year was then called "year of the captivity of Jehoiachin".

During the Hellenistic Maccabean period, Seleucid era counting was used, at least in the Land of Israel (under Greek influence at the time). The Books of the Maccabees used Seleucid era dating exclusively, as did Josephus writing in the Roman period. From the 1st to 10th centuries, the center of world Judaism was in the Middle East (primarily Iraq and Palestine), (Note: Ancient Iraq and Palestine (region), not the modern territories with those names) and Jews in these regions also used Seleucid era dating, which they called the "Era of Contracts [or Documents]"; this counting is still sometimes used by Yemenite Jews. The Talmud states:

Rav Aha bar Jacob then put this question: How do we know that our Era [of Documents] is connected with the Kingdom of Greece at all? Why not say that it is reckoned from the Exodus from Egypt, omitting the first thousand years and giving the years of the next thousand? In that case, the document is really post-dated!
Said Rav Nahman: In the Diaspora the Greek Era alone is used.
He [Rav Aha] thought that Rav Nahman wanted to dispose of him anyhow, but when he went and studied it thoroughly he found that it is indeed taught [in a Baraita]: In the Diaspora the Greek Era alone is used.

In the 8th and 9th centuries, as the center of Jewish life moved from Babylonia to Europe, counting using the Seleucid era "became meaningless", and thus was replaced by the anno mundi system. The use of the Seleucid era continued till the 16th century in the East, and was employed even in the 19th century among Yemenite Jews.

Occasionally in Talmudic writings, reference was made to other starting points for eras, such as destruction era dating, being the number of years since the 70 CE destruction of the Second Temple.

=== Leap months ===
According to Rabbinic Judaism, Exodus 12:1–2 requires that the months be determined by a proper court with the necessary authority to sanctify the months. Hence the court, not the astronomy, has the final decision. When the observational form of the calendar was in use, whether a leap month was added depended on three factors: 'aviv [i.e., the ripeness of barley], fruits of trees, and the equinox. On two of these grounds it should be intercalated, but not on one of them alone. It may be noted that in the Bible the name of the first month, Aviv, literally means "spring". Thus, if Adar was over and spring had not yet arrived, an additional month was observed.

=== Determining the new month in the Mishnaic period ===
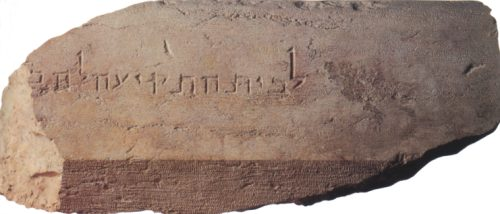
The Trumpeting Place inscription, a stone (2.43×1 m) with Hebrew inscription "To the Trumpeting Place" is believed to be a part of the Second Temple.

The Tanakh contains several commandments related to the keeping of the calendar and the lunar cycle, and records changes that have taken place to the Hebrew calendar. Numbers 10:10 stresses the importance in Israelite religious observance of the new month (Hebrew: ראש חודש, Rosh Chodesh, "beginning of the month"): "... in your new moons, ye shall blow with the trumpets over your burnt-offerings..." Similarly in Numbers 28:11. "The beginning of the month" meant the appearance of a new moon, and in Exodus 12:2. "This month is to you".

According to the Mishnah and Tosefta, in the Maccabean, Herodian, and Mishnaic periods, new months were determined by the sighting of a new crescent, with two eyewitnesses required to testify to the Sanhedrin to having seen the new lunar crescent at sunset. The practice in the time of Gamaliel II (c. 100 CE) was for witnesses to select the appearance of the moon from a collection of drawings that depicted the crescent in a variety of orientations, only a few of which could be valid in any given month. These observations were compared against calculations.

At first, the beginning of each Jewish month was signaled to the communities of Israel and beyond by fires lit on mountaintops. However, after the Samaritans began to light false fires, messengers were sent. The inability of the messengers to reach communities outside Israel before mid-month High Holy Days (Succot and Passover) led outlying communities to celebrate scriptural festivals for two days rather than one, observing the second feast-day of the Jewish diaspora because of uncertainty over whether the previous month ended after 29 or 30 days.

==== Historicity ====
It has been noted that the procedures described in the Mishnah and Tosefta are all plausible procedures for regulating an empirical lunar calendar. Fire-signals, for example, or smoke-signals, are known from the pre-exilic Lachish ostraca. Furthermore, the Mishnah contains laws that reflect the uncertainties of an empirical calendar. Mishnah Sanhedrin, for example, holds that when one witness holds that an event took place on a certain day of the month, and another that the same event took place on the following day, their testimony can be held to agree, since the length of the preceding month was uncertain. Another Mishnah takes it for granted that it cannot be known in advance whether a year's lease is for twelve or thirteen months. Hence it is a reasonable conclusion that the Mishnaic calendar was actually used in the Mishnaic period.

The accuracy of the Mishnah's claim that the Mishnaic calendar was also used in the late Second Temple period is less certain. One scholar has noted that there are no laws from Second Temple period sources that indicate any doubts about the length of a month or of a year. This led him to propose that the priests must have had some form of computed calendar or calendrical rules that allowed them to know in advance whether a month would have 30 or 29 days, and whether a year would have 12 or 13 months.

=== The fixing of the calendar ===
Between 70 and 1178 CE, the observation-based calendar was gradually replaced by a mathematically calculated one.

The Talmuds indicate at least the beginnings of a transition from a purely empirical to a computed calendar. Samuel of Nehardea (c. 165–254) stated that he could determine the dates of the holidays by calculation rather than observation. According to a statement attributed to Yose (late 3rd century), Purim could not fall on a Sabbath nor a Monday, lest Yom Kippur fall on a Friday or a Sunday. This indicates that, by the time of the redaction of the Jerusalem Talmud (c. 400 CE), there were a fixed number of days in all months from Adar to Elul, also implying that the extra month was already a second Adar added before the regular Adar. Elsewhere, Shimon ben Pazi is reported to have counseled "those who make the computations" not to set Rosh Hashana or Hoshana Rabbah on Shabbat. This indicates that there was a group who "made computations" and controlled, to some extent, the day of the week on which Rosh Hashana would fall.

There is a tradition, first mentioned by Hai Gaon (died 1038 CE), that Hillel II was responsible for the new calculated calendar with a fixed intercalation cycle "in the year 670 of the Seleucid era" (i.e., 358–359 CE). Later writers, such as Nachmanides, explained Hai Gaon's words to mean that the entire computed calendar was due to Hillel II in response to persecution of Jews. Maimonides (12th century) stated that the Mishnaic calendar was used "until the days of Abaye and Rava" (c. 320–350 CE), and that the change came when "the land of Israel was destroyed, and no permanent court was left." Taken together, these two traditions suggest that Hillel II (whom they identify with the mid-4th-century Jewish patriarch Ioulos, attested in a letter of the Emperor Julian, and the Jewish patriarch Ellel, mentioned by Epiphanius) instituted the computed Hebrew calendar because of persecution. H. Graetz linked the introduction of the computed calendar to a sharp repression following a failed Jewish insurrection that occurred during the rule of the Christian emperor Constantius and Gallus. Saul Lieberman argued instead that the introduction of the fixed calendar was due to measures taken by Christian Roman authorities to prevent the Jewish patriarch from sending calendrical messengers.

Both the tradition that Hillel II instituted the complete computed calendar, and the theory that the computed calendar was introduced due to repression or persecution, have been questioned. Furthermore, two Jewish dates during post-Talmudic times (specifically in 506 and 776) are impossible under the rules of the modern calendar, indicating that some of its arithmetic rules were established in Babylonia during the times of the Geonim (7th to 8th centuries). Most likely, the procedure established in 359 involved a fixed molad interval slightly different from the current one, (Note: An interval of 29 days/12 hours/792 halakim, as opposed to the current interval of 29/12/793) Rosh Hashana postponement rules similar but not identical to current rules, (Note: Unlike in the current calendar, the first day of Rosh Hashana was permitted to fall on Sunday; otherwise the rules were about the same.) and leap months were added based on when Passover preceded a fixed cutoff date rather than through a repeated 19-year cycle. The Rosh Hashana rules apparently reached their modern form between 629 and 648, the modern molad interval was likely fixed in 776, while the fixed 19-year cycle also likely dates to the late 8th century.

Except for the epoch year number (the fixed reference point at the beginning of year 1, which at that time was one year later than the epoch of the modern calendar), the calendar rules reached their current form by the beginning of the 9th century, as described by the Persian Muslim astronomer Muhammad ibn Musa al-Khwarizmi in 823. Al-Khwarizmi's study of the Jewish calendar describes the 19-year intercalation cycle, the rules for determining on what day of the week the first day of the month Tishrei shall fall, the interval between the Jewish era (creation of Adam) and the Seleucid era, and the rules for determining the mean longitude of the sun and the moon using the Jewish calendar. Not all the rules were in place by 835.

In 921, Aaron ben Meïr had a debate with Saadya Gaon about one of the rules of the calendar. This indicates that the rules of the modern calendar were not so clear and set. In 1000, the Muslim chronologist al-Biruni described all of the modern rules of the Hebrew calendar, except that he specified three different epochs used by various Jewish communities being one, two, or three years later than the modern epoch.

In 1178, Maimonides included all the rules for the calculated calendar and their scriptural basis, including the modern epochal year, in his work Mishneh Torah. He wrote that he had chosen the epoch from which calculations of all dates should be as "the third day of Nisan in this present year ... which is the year 4938 of the creation of the world" (22 March 1178). Today, these rules are generally used by Jewish communities throughout the world.

== Other calendars ==
Outside of Rabbinic Judaism, evidence shows a diversity of practice.

=== Karaite calendar ===
Karaites use the lunar month and the solar year, but the Karaite calendar differs from the current Rabbinic calendar in a number of ways. The Karaite calendar is identical to the Rabbinic calendar used before the Sanhedrin changed the Rabbinic calendar from the lunar, observation based, calendar to the current, mathematically based, calendar used in Rabbinic Judaism today.

In the lunar Karaite calendar, the beginning of each month, the Rosh Chodesh, can be calculated, but is confirmed by the observation in Israel of the first sightings of the new moon. This may result in an occasional variation of a maximum of one day, depending on the inability to observe the new moon. The day is usually "picked up" in the next month.

The addition of the leap month (Adar II) is determined by observing in Israel the ripening of barley at a specific stage (defined by Karaite tradition) (called aviv), rather than using the calculated and fixed calendar of rabbinic Judaism. Occasionally this results in Karaites being one month ahead of other Jews using the calculated rabbinic calendar. The "lost" month would be "picked up" in the next cycle when Karaites would observe a leap month while other Jews would not.

Furthermore, the seasonal drift of the rabbinic calendar is avoided, resulting in the years affected by the drift starting one month earlier in the Karaite calendar.

Also, the four rules of postponement of the rabbinic calendar are not applied, since they are not mentioned in the Tanakh. This can affect the dates observed for all the Jewish holidays in a particular year by one or two days.

In the Middle Ages many Karaite Jews outside Israel followed the calculated rabbinic calendar, because it was not possible to retrieve accurate aviv barley data from the land of Israel. However, since the establishment of the State of Israel, and especially since the Six-Day War, the Karaite Jews that have made aliyah can now again use the observational calendar.

=== Samaritan calendar ===
The Samaritan community's calendar also relies on lunar months and solar years. Calculation of the Samaritan calendar has historically been a secret reserved to the priestly family alone, and was based on observations of the new crescent moon. More recently, a 20th-century Samaritan High Priest transferred the calculation to a computer algorithm. The current High Priest confirms the results twice a year, and then distributes calendars to the community.

The epoch of the Samaritan calendar is year of the entry of the Children of Israel into the Land of Israel with Joshua. The month of Passover is the first month in the Samaritan calendar, but the year number increments in the sixth month. Like in the Rabbinic calendar, there are seven leap years within each 19-year cycle. However, the Rabbinic and Samaritan calendars' cycles are not synchronized, so Samaritan festivals—notionally the same as the Rabbinic festivals of Torah origin—are frequently one month off from the date according to the Rabbinic calendar. Additionally, as in the Karaite calendar, the Samaritan calendar does not apply the four rules of postponement, since they are not mentioned in the Tanakh. This can affect the dates observed for all the Jewish holidays in a particular year by one or two days.

=== The Qumran calendar ===
Many of the Dead Sea Scrolls have references to a unique calendar, used by the people there, who are often assumed to have been Essenes. The year of this calendar used the ideal Mesopotamian calendar of twelve 30-day months, to which were added 4 days at the equinoxes and solstices (cardinal points), making a total of 364 days.

With only 364 days, the calendar would be very noticeably different from the actual seasons after a few years, but there is nothing to indicate what was done about this problem. Various scholars have suggested that nothing was done and the calendar was allowed to change with respect to the seasons, or that changes were made irregularly when the seasonal anomaly was too great to be ignored any longer.

=== Other calendars used by ancient Jews ===
Calendrical evidence for the postexilic Persian period is found in papyri from the Jewish colony at Elephantine, in Egypt. These documents show that the Jewish community of Elephantine used the Egyptian and Babylonian calendars.

The Sardica paschal table shows that the Jewish community of some eastern city, possibly Antioch, used a calendrical scheme that kept Nisan 14 within the limits of the Julian month of March. Some of the dates in the document are clearly corrupt, but they can be emended to make the sixteen years in the table consistent with a regular intercalation scheme. Peter, the bishop of Alexandria (early 4th century CE), mentions that the Jews of his city "hold their Passover according to the course of the moon in the month of Phamenoth, or according to the intercalary month every third year in the month of Pharmuthi", suggesting a fairly consistent intercalation scheme that kept Nisan 14 approximately between Phamenoth 10 (6 March in the 4th century CE) and Pharmuthi 10 (5 April).

Jewish funerary inscriptions from Zoar (south of the Dead Sea), dated from the 3rd to the 5th century, indicate that when years were intercalated, the intercalary month was at least sometimes a repeated month of Adar. The inscriptions, however, reveal no clear pattern of regular intercalations, nor do they indicate any consistent rule for determining the start of the lunar month.

== See also ==
- Biblical and Talmudic units of measurement – Units of measurement in Jewish religious texts
- Chronology of the Bible
- Hebrew astronomy – Astronomy written in Hebrew or by Hebrew speakers
- Jewish astrology
- List of observances set by the Hebrew calendar
- Weekly Torah portion – Portion of the Torah read during Jewish prayer

== Bibliography ==
- Ari Belenkiy. "A Unique Feature of the Jewish Calendar – Dehiyot". Culture and Cosmos 6 (2002) 3–22.
- Sherrard Beaumont Burnaby. Elements of the Jewish and Muhammadan Calendars. George Bell and Sons, London, 1901 – Internet Archive link.
- Nathan Bushwick. Understanding the Jewish Calendar. Moznaim, New York/Jerusalem, 1989. ISBN 0-940118-17-3
- William Moses Feldman. Rabbinical Mathematics and Astronomy, 3rd ed., Sepher-Hermon Press, New York, 1978.
- The Code of Maimonides (Mishneh Torah), Book Three, Treatise Eight: Sanctification of the New Moon. Translated by Solomon Gandz. Yale Judaica Series Volume XI, Yale University Press, New Haven, Conn., 1956.
- Edward M. Reingold and Nachum Dershowitz. Calendrical Calculations: The Millennium Edition. Cambridge University Press; 2 edition (2001). ISBN 0-521-77752-6 723–730.
- Arthur Spier. The Comprehensive Hebrew Calendar: Twentieth to the Twenty-Second Century 5660–5860/1900–2100. Feldheim Publishers, Jerusalem/New York, 1986.
- Stern, Sacha (2001). Calendar and Community: A History of the Jewish Calendar 2nd Century BCE to 10th Century CE. Oxford University Press. ISBN 978-0-19-827034-8.
- Ernest Wiesenberg. "Appendix: Addenda and Corrigenda to Treatise VIII". The Code of Maimonides (Mishneh Torah), Book Three: The Book of Seasons. Yale Judaica Series Volume XIV, Yale University Press, New Haven, Conn., 1961. pp. 557–602.
- Francis Henry Woods. "Calendar (Hebrew)", Encyclopædia of Religion and Ethics. T. & T. Clark, Edinburgh, 1910, vol. 3, pp. 108–109.
