= Epiboly =

Cell movement during embryonic development

Epiboly describes one of the five major types of cell movements that occur in the gastrulation stage of embryonic development of some organisms. Epiboly is the spreading and thinning of the ectoderm while the endoderm and mesoderm layers move to the inside of the embryo.

When undergoing epiboly, a monolayer of cells must undergo a physical change in shape in order to spread. Alternatively, multiple layers of cells can also undergo epiboly as the position of cells is changed or the cell layers undergo intercalation. While human embryos do not experience epiboly, this movement can be studied in sea urchins, tunicates, amphibians, and most commonly zebrafish.

Epibolic movement of cells during gastrulation

== Zebrafish ==
=== General movements ===
Epiboly in zebrafish is the first coordinated cell movement, beginning at the dome stage late in the blastula period and continuing throughout gastrulation. At this point the zebrafish embryo contains three portions: an epithelial monolayer known as the enveloping layer (EVL), a yolk syncytial layer (YSL) which is a membrane-enclosed group of nuclei that lie on top of the yolk cell, and the deep cells (DEL) of the blastoderm which will eventually form the embryo's three germ layers (ectoderm, mesoderm, and endoderm). The EVL, YSL, and DEL all undergo epiboly.

Schematic of Zebra Fish epiboly

Cartoon of a 4-hour post fertilization zebrafish embryo, before the initiation of epiboly

Radial intercalation occurs in the DEL. Interior cells of the blastoderm move towards the outer cells, thus "intercalating" with each other. The blastoderm begins to thin as it spreads toward the vegetal pole of the embryo until it has completely engulfed the yolk cell. The EVL also moves vegetally during epiboly, increasing its surface area as it spreads. Work in the ray-finned fish fundulus has shown that no large rearrangements occur in the EVL; instead, cells at the leading edge of the EVL align and constrict. The YSL also moves towards the vegetal pole, spreading along the surface of the yolk and migrating slightly ahead of the blastomeres. Once epiboly is complete, the DEL, EVL, and YSL have engulfed the yolk cell, forming a closure known as the blastopore.

=== Molecular mechanisms of epiboly ===
==== Cytoskeletal and cell adhesion components ====
Completion of epiboly requires the coordination of cytoskeletal changes across the embryo. The YSL appears to play a prominent role in this process. Studies on fundulus demonstrated that the YSL is capable of undergoing epiboly even when the blastoderm has been removed, however, the blastoderm cannot undergo epiboly in the absence of the YSL. In zebrafish, there is a microtubule array in the yolk that extends from the animal to the vegetal pole of the embryo, and that contracts as epiboly progresses. Treating embryos with the microtubule depolymerizing agent nocodazole completely blocks epiboly of the YSL and partially blocks epiboly of the blastoderm, while treating with the microtubule stabilizing agent taxol blocks epiboly of all cell layers. There is also evidence for the importance of actin-based structures in epiboly. Ring-like structures of filamentous actin have been observed at the leading edge of the enveloping layer, where it contacts the yolk cell. It is thought that a network of filamentous actin in the yolk might constrict in a myosin-II dependent manner to close the blastopore at the end of epiboly, via a "purse-string mechanism". Treating embryos with the actin destabilizer cytochalasin b results in delayed or arrested epiboly.

There is still debate on the extent to which the DEL and EVL epibolic movements are active movements. The EVL contacts the YSL by means of tight junctions. It is thought that these contacts allow the YSL to "tow" the EVL towards the vegetal pole. Claudin E is a molecule found in tight junctions that appears to be expressed in the EVL and required for normal zebrafish epiboly, supporting this hypothesis. Additionally, zebrafish embryos that fail to make a fully differentiated EVL show defects in epibolic movements of the DEL, EVL, and YSL, suggesting a requirement for a normal EVL for the epiboly of all three cell layers.

The cell-cell adhesion molecule E-cadherin has been shown to be required for the radial intercalation of the deep cells. Many other molecules involved in cell-cell contact are implicated in zebrafish epiboly, including G alpha (12/13) which interacts with E-cadherin and actin, as well as the cell adhesion molecule EpCam in the EVL, which may modulate adhesion with the underlying deep cells.

==== Signaling ====
The molecule fibronectin has been found to play a role in radial intercalation. Other signaling pathways that appear to function in epiboly include the Wnt/PCP pathway, PDGF-PI3K pathway, Eph-Ephrin signaling, JAK-STAT signaling, and the MAP kinase cascade.

== Other vertebrates ==
Epibolic movements have been conserved in vertebrates. Though most work on epiboly has been done in fish, there is also a body of work concerning epiboly in the African clawed frog, Xenopus laevis. Comparisons of epiboly in amniotes, teleosts and X. laevis show that the key movement of epiboly in the fish and frog is radial intercalation while in amniotes it would appear to be cell division in the plane of the epithelium. All groups undergo cell shape changes such as the characteristic flattening of cells to increase surface area.
