= Molad =

Hebrew word

Molad (מולד, plural Moladot, מולדות) is a Hebrew word meaning "birth" that also generically refers to the time at which the new moon is "born". The word is ambiguous, however, because depending on the context, it could refer to the actual or mean astronomical lunar conjunction (calculated by a specified method, for a specified time zone), or the molad of the traditional Hebrew calendar (or another specified calendar), or at a specified locale the first visibility of the new lunar crescent after a lunar conjunction.

Other than its usage connected with the lunar cycle, מולד is also the word used in the Hebrew term for Christmas, חג המולד (literally "Holiday of the Birth" or "Holiday of the Nativity").

== The traditional molad interval ==
The average molad (Hebrew: מוֹלָד אֶמְצָעִי, romanized: molād eməṣāʿi), which is used for the traditional Hebrew calendar, is based on a constant interval cycle that is widely but incorrectly regarded as an approximation of the time in Jerusalem of the mean lunar conjunction. Each molad moment occurs exactly 29 days 12 hours 44 minutes and 3+^{1}/_{3} seconds (or, equivalently, 29 days 12 hours and 44+^{1}/_{18} minutes) after the previous molad moment. This interval is numerically the same as the length of the mean synodic month that was published by Ptolemy in the Almagest, who cited Hipparchus as its source.

Although in the era of Hipparchus (2nd century BC), this interval was equal to the average time between lunar conjunctions, mean lunation intervals get progressively shorter due to tidal transfer of angular momentum from Earth to Moon. Consequently, the molad interval is now about ^{3}/_{5} of a second too long.

The molad interval as an exact improper fraction = 29+^{12}/_{24}+^{44}/_{1440}+^{(10/3)}/_{86400} = ^{765433}/_{25920} days, where the denominator 25920 is the number of parts per day (each part equals ^{1}/_{18} minute or ^{10}/_{3} seconds) and one can alternatively write the numerator in the interesting descending sequence 765432+1. As a mixed fraction this reduces to 29+^{13753}/_{25920} days, which implies an underlying fixed arithmetic lunar cycle of 25920 months in which 13753 months have 30 days and the remaining 25920 – 13753 = 12167 months have 29 days, spread as smoothly as possible. In any such lunar cycle, which must have an integer number of days, 30-day months must occur slightly more frequently than 29-day months, such that 2 consecutive 30-day months occur at intervals of either 17 or 15 months, where the 17-month interval is approximately twice as common as the 15-month interval.

This typical mean lunar cycle pattern becomes clearly evident if one computes the molad moment, adds ^{1}/_{4} day to account for the molad zakein postponement rule, keeps only the integer part of the result to compute the molad day, calculates the difference from the previous molad day (will be either 30 days = "F" for full, or 29 days = "D" for deficient), and then lists the sequence with the insertion of one space in the middle of every FF pair and starting a new line at the end of every 15-month interval. For example, for the period from the molad of Nisan 5726 (Gregorian date March 22, 1966) until the molad of Elul 5818 (Gregorian date August 21, 2058) inclusive, the pattern obtained is:

FDFDFDFDFDFDFDFDF FDFDFDFDFDFDFDFDF FDFDFDFDFDFDFDF FDFDFDFDFDFDFDFDF FDFDFDFDFDFDFDFDF FDFDFDFDFDFDFDF FDFDFDFDFDFDFDFDF FDFDFDFDFDFDFDFDF FDFDFDFDFDFDFDF FDFDFDFDFDFDFDFDF FDFDFDFDFDFDFDFDF FDFDFDFDFDFDFDF FDFDFDFDFDFDFDFDF FDFDFDFDFDFDFDFDF FDFDFDFDFDFDFDF FDFDFDFDFDFDFDFDF FDFDFDFDFDFDFDFDF FDFDFDFDFDFDFDF FDFDFDFDFDFDFDFDF FDFDFDFDFDFDFDFDF FDFDFDFDFDFDFDF FDFDFDFDFDFDFDFDF FDFDFDFDFDFDFDFDF FDFDFDFDFDFDFDF FDFDFDFDFDFDFDFDF FDFDFDFDFDFDFDFDF FDFDFDFDFDFDFDF FDFDFDFDFDFDFDFDF FDFDFDFDFDFDFDFDF FDFDFDFDFDFDFDF FDFDFDFDFDFDFDFDF FDFDFDFDFDFDFDFDF FDFDFDFDFDFDFDF FDFDFDFDFDFDFDFDF FDFDFDFDFDFDFDFDF FDFDFDFDFDFDFDF FDFDFDFDFDFDFDFDF FDFDFDFDFDFDFDFDF FDFDFDFDFDFDFDF FDFDFDFDFDFDFDFDF FDFDFDFDFDFDFDFDF FDFDFDFDFDFDFDF FDFDFDFDFDFDFDFDF FDFDFDFDFDFDFDFDF FDFDFDFDFDFDFDF FDFDFDFDFDFDFDFDF FDFDFDFDFDFDFDFDF FDFDFDFDFDFDFDF FDFDFDFDFDFDFDFDF FDFDFDFDFDFDFDFDF FDFDFDFDFDFDFDF FDFDFDFDFDFDFDFDF FDFDFDFDFDFDFDFDF FDFDFDFDFDFDFDF FDFDFDFDFDFDFDFDF FDFDFDFDFDFDFDFDF FDFDFDFDFDFDFDF FDFDFDFDFDFDFDFDF FDFDFDFDFDFDFDFDF FDFDFDFDFDFDFDF FDFDFDFDFDFDFDFDF FDFDFDFDFDFDFDFDF FDFDFDFDFDFDFDF FDFDFDFDFDFDFDFDF FDFDFDFDFDFDFDFDF FDFDFDFDFDFDFDF FDFDFDFDFDFDFDFDF FDFDFDFDFDFDFDFDF FDFDFDFDFDFDFDF FDFDFDFDFDFDFDFDF

In the above partial sequence, which spans just one era of the molad cycle, it is obvious that there are twice as many 17-month groups as there are 15-month groups (23 repeats of a 17+17+15=49 month sequence), except for the stand-alone 17-month group at the end of the era, yielding a total of 1144 months in the era. Another era type, which occurs half as frequently (8<15), has only 22 repeats of the 49 month sequence before the 17-month end group, yielding 1095 months in the era.

== The molad epoch ==
The traditional epoch of the cycle was 5 hours 11 minutes and 20 seconds after the mean sunset (considered to be 6 hours before mean midnight) at the epoch of the Hebrew calendar (first eve of Tishrei of Hebrew year 1). The traditional source for this moment is as follows:

- Adam, the first man, was considered to have seen the first lunar crescent at the start of the 9th hour of the daytime on the 6th day of Creation (20 hours from the sunset that started that date), when God commanded him never to eat from the Tree of Knowledge. The days of Creation are traditionally considered to have been the final days of Hebrew year 1, so this observation sanctified the month of Tishrei of year 2.
- Traditionally, assuming that the lunar conjunction was 6 hours earlier, the moment of the molad of the month of Tishrei of Hebrew year 2 was at the start of the 3rd hour of the daytime on Friday (14 hours from the sunset that started that date).
- The molad of Tishrei of Hebrew year 1 was considered to have occurred 12 lunar months earlier, where each lunar month equals the traditional molad interval.
- A single molad interval is 1 day 12 hours 793 parts in excess of a whole number of weeks, so the excess from 12 molad intervals is 4 days 8 hours 876 parts.
- Therefore, the molad epoch was on (6 days 14 hours) – (4 days 8 hours 876 parts) = 2nd day 5 hours 204 parts.

The molad epoch is known by the name BeHaRad, which is an acronym based on the Hebrew letters beit = 2 for the 2nd day, hey = 5 for the 5th hour, and resh daled = 200 + 4 = 204 parts.

== Announcing the molad moment ==
Although the moment of the traditional Hebrew calendar molad is announced in synagogues on the Shabbat prior to each month (except before Tishrei), its only relevance to the present day fixed arithmetic lunisolar Hebrew calendar is that the molad of the month of Tishrei determines the date of the New Year Day (Rosh Hashanah), subject to possible postponements of 0, 1 or 2 days (depending on certain postponement rules, also see external link).

Traditionally the announced or printed molad moment is quoted in terms of the hours, minutes, and 18ths of a minute (parts) elapsed from mean sunset, because Hebrew calendar days begin at sunset. Some printed sources subtract 6 hours to convert the molad moment to "civil" time, but doing so causes the Hebrew weekday to be wrong 25% of the time (whenever the molad moment is between sunset and midnight). Also, some printed sources even add an hour during the summertime for "daylight saving", or attempt to apply conversions to the local time zone, but those are also mistakes because they would affect the molad of Tishrei and thus could imply an erroneous date for Rosh Hashanah.

Yaaqov Loewinger of Tel Aviv, Israel, published a Hebrew essay that thoroughly reviewed the multiple widespread improper ways as well as the single proper way to publish and announce the molad moment. Loewinger also showed how the practice of announcing the molad moment is itself a very recent innovation in Jewish practice, practically unheard of before the 20th century.

== Molad amiti (מולד אמתי, real molad) ==
The molad amiti (real molad), which has no relevance to the Hebrew calendar, is the time at which the actual astronomical lunar conjunction occurs, often expressed either as the mean solar time in Jerusalem (Universal Time + 2h 20m 56.9s or simply + 2h 21m) or as the clock time in Israel. If the moment is desired for ritual or social purposes then it may be best to express it in terms of the local clock time.

On average the traditional molad of the Hebrew calendar is currently >2 hours late, and there are substantial periodic variations in the astronomical lunar cycle length, such that in the present era it varies over a 28-hour span ranging from 12 hours early to 16 hours late, compared to the Jerusalem mean solar time molad amiti, if all months are included in the evaluation. If the evaluation is limited to a single Hebrew month, however, for example Tishrei, then the portion of the variations that are due to Earth orbital eccentricity are for the most part eliminated and the average has an offset that is month-specific, such that presently the molad of Tishrei varies over about a 20-hour span ranging from 4 hours early to 16 hours late.

== See also ==
- Hebrew calendar
- Month
- Orbit of the Moon
