= Nisan-years =

Ancient calendar system used around Mesopotamia

Nisan-years is an ancient calendar system used around Mesopotamia. Its beginning was from the prehistorical era. Ever since Mesopotamia had historical writings, even before the First Babylonian dynasty of Hammurabi, its calendar used the Nisan-years.

Nisan-years is a lunisolar calendar system, in which the lunar years and the solar years are synchronized by adding in an intercalary month in seven of nineteen years (called the Metonic cycle). Since a tropical year is 365.2422 days, and a synodic month is averaged 29.53059 days, in nineteen years the solar and the lunar calendars will only differ by about two hours, or 1 part in 80,000.

Nisan-years begin in the Spring season. Technically, its New Year's Day is the day after the New Moon closest to (within fifteen days before or after) the Spring equinox, when the day and the night is of equal length, typically March 20 in the Gregorian Calendar). It begins the first month, named Nisanu/Nisan/Abib.

== Israel ==
Nisan-years is often called the Jewish religious calendar, in contrast to Tishri-years, which is often called the Jewish civil calendar. The month of Nisan is important since it begins the Spring Feasts of Israel.

The way to determine whether or not an intercalary month should be added was by agricultural observation in Israel. If by the end of a Nisan-year barley did not grow spikes a month was added so that barley can be harvested in the month of Nisan.

Jewish tradition fixed Nisan 16, the second day after Passover (Nisan 15), as the wave offering or omer offering in Israel, when a portion of the harvested barley is dedicated to God as a Thanksgiving. Karaites and Sadducees, however, fixed it on the first day after the Shabbat based on their interpretation of "Shabbat" in (Leviticus 23:9-14), which simply means day of rest, which can mean either the seventh day of the week, or alternatively a holy convocation on a weekday depending on the context.

== Calendar ==
Month Number	Babylonian Name	Jewish Name	Hebrew Name	Canaanite Name	Gregorian Months
First	Nisanu	Nisan	Abib	Zib	March–April
Second	Aianu	Iyyar	Ziv	Mattan	April–May
Third	Simanu	Sivan		Zabh Shamash	May–June
Fourth	Duzu	Tammuz		Kirar	June–July
Fifth	Abu	Av		Mopa' Lepani	July–August
Sixth	Ululu	Elul		Mopa'	August–September
Seventh	Tishritu	Tishri	Ethanim	Attanim	September–October
Eighth	Arahsamnu	Heshvan/Macheshvan	Bul	Bul	October–November
Ninth	Kislimu	Kislev		Merape'	November–December
Tenth	Tebetu	Tevet		Pagarim	December–January
Eleventh	Shabatu	Shevat	Tsakh	Pa'alat	January–February
Twelfth	Addaru	Adar		Hiyar	February–March

The observation of the New Moon may be influenced by the weather condition, so the Rosh Chodesh may be delayed for one or two days. But over all the errors cancel each other, and the calendar system remains accurate.

The intercalary month could be a second Sixth Month (Ululu II), as often practiced in Mesopotamia, or a second Twelfth Month (Adar II, Adar Sheni, or ve-Adar) as consistently practices in Israel.

== See also ==
- Babylonian calendar
- Small Mahzor
