= Sardica paschal table =

The Sardica paschal table or Sardica document is a document from a Latin manuscript of the 7th/8th century AD. It is a copy in Latin translation of the creed of the Eastern Christian bishops attending the Council of Sardica who, fearing that their deliberations would be dominated by Western bishops, met separately at Philippopolis. Appended to the creed and anathemas is a table of Paschal full moon dates, given as dates in the Julian calendar, for the years 328 to 357, together with a list of dates of 14 Nisan in the Jewish calendar, also referred to the Julian calendar, for the years 328 to 343, the year of the Council. The calendrical information contained in the document has been used by scholars in tracing the history of the computus and of the Hebrew calendar.

== The manuscript and the contents of the document ==
The Sardica paschal table is a part of Codex Verona LX(58), or, more fully, MS Verona, Biblioteca Capitolare LX(58). It was first published by Eduard Schwartz in his Christliche und jüdische Ostertafeln (Berlin, 1905), where the manuscript in which it occurs was called Codex Verona 60. The manuscript has 126 leaves of vellum measuring 27 cm by 20 cm. It is written in Latin uncial script that paleographers have dated to about AD 700. The Sardica document occurs on folios 79 verso to 80 verso. It is apparently a copy of a Christian document written at the time of the Council of Sardica (AD 343). It contains the creed and anathemas drawn up by the eastern bishops meeting at the council, followed by a list of Christian "Passovers", that is, Julian calendar dates of the 14th day (the Paschal full moon) of the Paschal lunar month, the Sunday following which is Easter. This table is preceded by a list of Julian calendar dates of 14 Nisan observed by the Jewish community in some eastern Mediterranean city (possibly Antioch). The Jewish dates are captioned Quibus supputationibus faciant Iudei pascha. The Christian dates are captioned Quo numero faciamus nos Christiani.

The dates as they stand are somewhat garbled. Schwartz proposed emendations, and these emendations have been reviewed and criticized recently by Sacha Stern of University College London.

A striking feature of the Jewish dates is that, for the 16 years listed, all the Passovers are in the Julian month of March. This is clearly inconsistent with the modern Hebrew calendar. It also corroborates the complaints of 3rd and 4th-century Christian computists that some Jews held Passover before the spring equinox.

== The text of the document ==
The Sardica paschal table, from MS Verona, Biblioteca Capitolare LX(58). The words at the top are quo tempore conveni magna synodus in civitate nicea. Before the first line of figures are the words quibus supputationibus faciunt Iudei pascha. Near the bottom of the left hand column of dates are the words quo numero facimus nos Christiani. Image from E. Schwartz,Christliche und jüdische Ostertafeln (Berlin, 1905)

The continuation of the document from the previous picture

The document, as published and emended by Schwartz in 1905 here follows. The leftmost column indicates the AD year assigned by Schwartz. The second and third columns transcribe the tables found in the manuscript. In these columns, square and angle brackets indicate Schwartz's emendations. In the numerals, a square bracket emendation indicates a character or characters that Schwartz thought should be deleted, while an angle bracket emendation indicates where Schwartz thought characters should be added. A note in square brackets with the letters MS indicate that the entire preceding word is Schwartz's emendation, and the word in brackets is the original.

De pascha autem scribsimus nobis XXX annos, quoniam XXX annos fecit dominus noster in carne super terram, pascha autem facta est XXX anno XXV die Martii mensis, computatur autem primus primus [sic] annus triginta annorum scriptorum in comp<u>tationibus in quibus faciunt Iudei phascha [sic] a prima indictione que facta est sub Constantino [328], quo tempore conveni<t> magna synodus in civitate Nicaea, cum diu quaererent episcopi de phascha ut computetur. prima indictio [indici MS]a primo anno computationis, et prima indictio inputata post quintam decimam est XVI anno positus in conputatione annorum pasche. a primo [must mean ab undecimo. A and IA were reversed in the original] anno computatur numerus iste usque ad XXX annum qui est primus mensis Aprilis.

This text translates approximately as follows: " We wrote for ourselves thirty years of paschal dates, as our Lord spent thirty years in flesh on the Earth. In the 30th year Passover falls in the XXV day of March. The first of the years listed before the 30 years in the computed dates in which Jews have Passover is computed starting from the first indiction occurred under Constantine. In this time a large synod met in Nicea town, as bishops had required for a long time that the dates of Passover be computed. The first indiction (starts) from the first year of the computed data and subsequent indiction is included after the fifteenth in year XVI of the computed Passover years. This number (=Passover date), which is the first of April(= April 11th, according to Schwartz' comment), is computed from the year I up to XXX".

Possiti [sic] autem sunt distinctiones numeri Iudeorum nobis sic quibus supputationibus faciant Iudei pascha

[328]	I an.	XI Mar.
[329]	II an.	XXX Mar.
[330]	III an.	XVIIII Mar.
[331]	IIII an.	[X]VIII Mar.
[332]	V an.	XXVII [XXIII MS] Mar.
[333]	VI an.	XVI Mar.
[334]	VII an.	V Mar.
[335]	VIII an.	XXIIII Mar.
[336]	VIIII an.	XIII [XVI MS] Mar.
[337]	X an.	II Mar.
[338]	XI an.	XXI Mar.
[339]	XII an.	X Mar.
[340]	XIII an.	XXV<IIII> Mar.
[341]	XIIII an.	XVIII[I] Mar.
[342]	XV an.	V<II> Mar.
[343]	XVI an.	[X]XXVI Mar.

Et Reliqui XIIII anni, quo numero facimus nos Christiani

[328, 358]	I an.	X Ap.
[329, 359]	II an.	XXX Mar. [Ap. MS]
[330, 360]	III an.	XVI<II> Ap. [Mar. MS]
[331, 361]	IIII an.	VI<I> Ap.
[332, 362]	V an.	<X>XVI<I> Mar.
[333, 363]	VI an.	XV Ap.
[334, 364]	VII an.	IIII Ap.
[335, 365]	VIII an.	XXIIII Mar.
[336, 366]	VIIII an.	XI<I> Ap.
[337, 367]	X an.	<I> Ap.
[338]	XI an.	XXI Mar. [Ap. MS]
[339]	XII an.	VIII<I> Ap. [Mar. MS]
[340]	XIII an.	XXVIIII Mar. [Ap. MS]
[341]	XIIII an.	XVI<I> Ap. [Mar. MS]
[342]	XV an.	VI Ap.
[343]	XVI an.	<X>XVI Mar. [Ap. MS]
[344]	XVII an.	XIIII Ap. [Mar. MS]
[345]	XVIII an.	[X]III Ap.
[346]	XVIIII an.	XXIII Mar. [Ap. MS]
[347]	XX an.	XI Ap. [Mar. MS]
[348]	XXI an.	XXX<I> Mar. [Ap. MS]
[349]	XXII an.	XVIIII Ap. [Mar. MS]
[350]	XXIII an.	VIII Ap.
[351]	<X>XIIII an.	XXVIII Mar. [Ap. MS]
[352]	<X>XV an.	XVI[I] Ap. [Mar. MS]
[353]	XXVI an.	V Ap.
[354]	XXVII an.	XXV Mar. [Ap. MS]
[355]	XXVIII an.	XIII Ap. [Mar. MS]
[356]	XXVIIII an.	II Ap.
[357]	XXX an.	XXII Mar. [Ap. MS]

== Calibration of the document ==
Since the document clearly states that the years run "from the first indiction that was under Constantine" [327-328], Schwartz's assignment of the years seems valid. Sacha Stern has analyzed the Jewish dates, and found that nine of the sixteen dates coincide with the 14th day of a lunar month if the first day of the month is taken to be the day of the lunar conjunction.

== Significance for the history of the Rabbinic calendar ==
Sacha Stern takes the Sardica document as evidence that the Jews referred to in the document (which he tentatively identifies as those of Antioch) used a computed, or partially computed, calendar with system of intercalations that kept 14 Nisan with the limits of Julian March. Since this differs from what can be known of the Jewish calendar in other cities, he concludes "the Jewish calendar could vary significantly from one community to the next."

== Significance for the history of the computus ==
The Sardica document, if it is accurate in its report of the dates of 14 Nisan for the Jewish community in some eastern Mediterranean city, corroborates the complaints of Christian writers of the 3rd and 4th centuries AD that some Jews set 14 Nisan before the spring equinox. This was one of the chief reasons given by Christians for their attempts to develop an independent calculation to determine the date of the Easter festival—to compute, in effect, a "Christian Nisan", and set Easter accordingly—rather than relying on information from Jewish neighbors about when Jewish Nisan would fall. Additionally, if Schwartz's emendations are accepted, they show the dates following a pattern in which the Christian dates for Nisan 14 agree with the Jewish dates whenever the latter fall on March 21 or later. Both emended columns employ a constant epact of 11 for the difference between the Julian and lunar years: Each year's date is 11 days earlier than the preceding year's, or 19 days later if the 11-day deduction would result in a Christian date earlier than March 21, or in a Jewish date earlier than March 1.

== Notes ==
=== References ===
- Schwartz, Eduard, Christliche und jüdische Ostertafeln, (Abhandlungen der königlichen Gesellschaft der Wissenschaften zu Göttingen. Philologisch-Historische Klasse. Neue Folge, Band viii, Berlin, 1905.
- Stern, Sacha, Calendar and Community: A History of the Jewish Calendar 2nd century BCE - 10th century CE, Oxford, 2001.
- Stern, Sacha, Calendars in Antiquity: Empires, States, and Societies, Oxford University Press 2012.
- Telfer, W., "The Codex Verona LX(58)", Harvard Theological Review, 36(3), (July, 1943), pages 169-246.
