= Tishri-years =

Ancient calendar system used in Israel/Judea, and the Jewish people in Diaspora

Tishri-years, often called the Jewish Civil Calendar, is an ancient calendar system used in Israel/Judea, and the Jewish diaspora. It is based on, and is a variation of, the Nisan-years, which is often called the Jewish Religious Calendar. Tishri-years is similar to, and sometimes equivalent to, the Ancient Macedonian calendar used by the Hellenistic empires (332-30 BCE). They are all lunisolar years beginning from Autumn, but could differ by a month.

== Origin ==
The origin of the Tishri-years tradition can be traced to King David, who was ordained the king of Judah (the two southern tribes) on Tishri 1, 1010 BCE, before he was ordained the king of Israel (the ten northern tribes) on Nisan 1, 1002 BCE. It seemed that David still used the Nisan-years in chronicling his years, but King Solomon made it a national calendar commemorating his great father. After the split of the kingdom in 931/930 BCE, Israel continued using Nisan-years, while Judah used the Tishri-years.

== Structure ==
While the Nisan-years begin the year around the Vernal equinox (Gregorian March 20/21), the Tishri-years begin the years around the Autumn equinox (Gregorian September 22/23). The New Year's Day of the Tishri-years is called Rosh Hashanah ("Head of the Year"); it begins the High Holy Days of Israel.

Tishri 1, however, is not determined directly by its relationship to the Autumn Equinox. It depends on the determination of Nisan 1, which is the day after the new moon closest to the March equinox (within fifteen days before or after). Tishri 1 is the first day of the seventh month. Although the month number is always counted from Nisan, in the Tishri-years, the year begins and ends with Tishri 1.

== Months ==
Month Order	Numbered Month	Babylonian Name	Jewish Name	Canaanite Name	Gregorian Months
1	Seventh	Tishritu	Tishri	Ethanim	September–October
2	Eighth	Arahsamnu	Heshvan/Marcheshvan	Bul	October–November
3	Ninth	Kislimu	Kislev		November–December
4	Tenth	Tebetu	Tevet		December–January
5	Eleventh	Shabatu	Shevat	Tsakh	January–February
6	Twelfth	Addaru	Adar		February–March
7	First	Nisanu	Nisan	Abib	March–April
8	Second	Aianu	Iyyar	Ziv	April–May
9	Third	Simanu	Sivan		May–June
10	Fourth	Duzu	Tammuz		June–July
11	Fifth	Abu	Av		July–August
12	Sixth	Ululu	Elul		August–September

The intercalary month is still the second Adar, initially determined by agricultural observations in Israel. Although meteorological conditions may cause a few days of delay for each Rosh Codesh ("Head of the Month"), over all the errors will cancel each other, and the calendar system remained accurate.

After the fourth century CE, Hillel II fixed the Jewish Talmudic Calendar by a mathematical algorithm, in order for Jews all around the world to observe the feasts according to the same calendar. This caused the Jewish calendar to gradually depart from the actual seasons, due to the accumulated errors.

The Jewish people kept on using the Tishri-years system throughout the first (Babylonian) and the second (Roman) Diaspora, until today. They also traced the system back till the time of creation.

== See also ==
- Babylonian calendar
- Hebrew calendar
