= Helek =

Time measurement in Jewish tradition

The helek, also spelled chelek (Hebrew חלק, meaning "portion", plural halakim חלקים) is a unit of time used in the calculation of the Molad. Other spellings used are chelak and chelek, both with plural chalakim.

An hour is divided into 1080 halakim. A helek is 3 1/3 seconds or ^{1}/_{18} minute. The helek derives from a small Babylonian time period called a she, meaning '"barleycorn", itself equal to ^{1}/_{72} of a Babylonian time degree (1° of celestial rotation).

360 degrees × 72 shes per degree / 24 hours = 1080 shes per hour.

The Hebrew calendar defines its mean month to be exactly equal to 29 days 12 hours and 793 halakim, which is 29 days 12 hours 44 minutes and 3 1/3 seconds. It defines its mean year as exactly 235/19 times this amount, or 365 days, 5 hours, 55 minutes, and 25 and 25/57 seconds (approximately 365.2468222 days).

== Bibliography ==
- "Molad Times - For the Jewish Years 5780 & 5781 (2020-2021)". www.chabad.org.
- "The Jewish calendar". faculty1.coloradocollege.edu.
- לוינגר, יעקב. "על הכרזת המולד בבתי הכנסת" (PDF). Daat (in Hebrew).
- "הלוח העברי - פרק ראשון: החודש". www.daat.ac.il.
