= Castrensis =

Castrensis is a Latin adjective derived from the noun castra (a neutral plurale tantum) meaning "military camp".

It is part of several titles of offices relating to the military such as abbas castrensis and/or travel, for example comes castrensis, also shortened to castrensis.

== See also ==
- The Italian jurist Paulus Castrensis
