= Intercalation =

Intercalation may refer to:

- Intercalation (chemistry), insertion of a molecule (or ion) into layered solids such as graphite
- Intercalation (timekeeping), insertion of a leap day, week or month into some calendar years to make the calendar follow the seasons
- Intercalation (university administration), period when a student is officially given time off from studying for an academic degree
- Intercalation (geology), a special form of interbedding, where two distinct depositional environments in close spatial proximity migrate back and forth across the border zone
- Intercalary chapter, a chapter in a novel that does not further the plot. See also frame story (sometimes called intercalation).
- In biology:
  - Intercalary segment, an appendage-less segment in the segmental composition of the heads of insects and Myriapoda
  - Intercalation (biochemistry), process discovered by Leonard Lerman by which certain drugs and mutagens insert themselves between base pairs of DNA
  - Intercalated cells of the amygdala
  - Intercalated cells of the collecting duct
  - Intercalated disc of cardiac muscle
  - Intercalated duct of exocrine glands
