= Alba Bible =

15th-century translation of the Hebrew Bible into Old Castilian

The Alba Bible
- The House of Alba
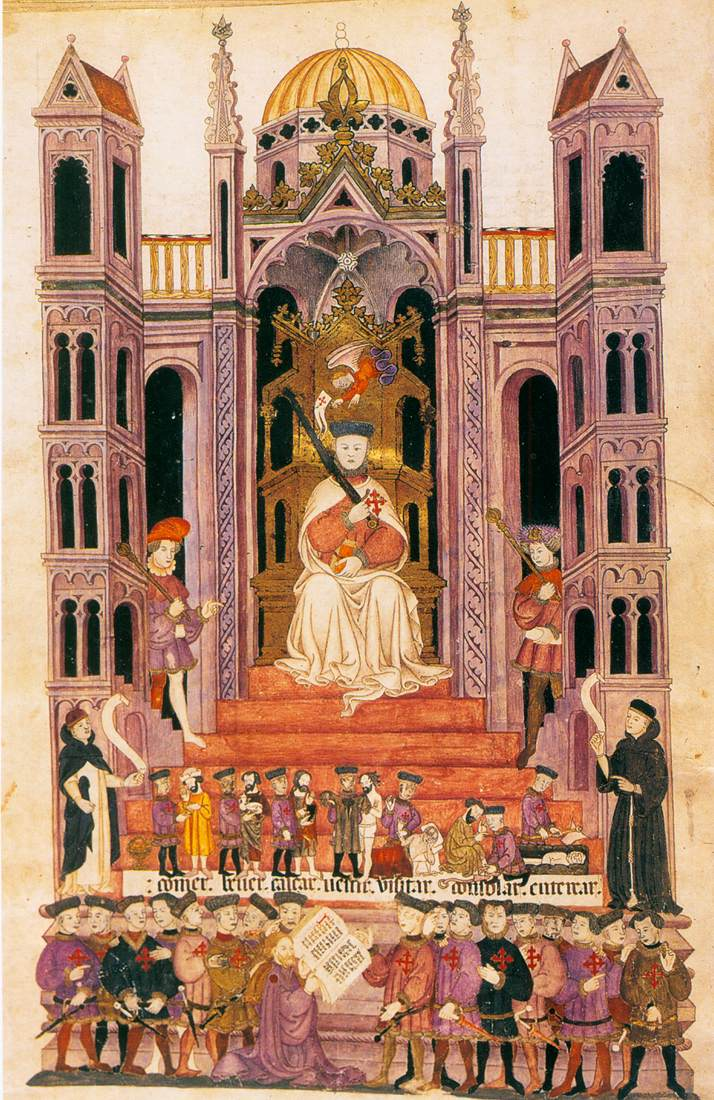
- Presentation miniature depicting Rabbi Moses handing over the manuscript to Luis de Guzmán
- Also known as: Arragel Bible
- Type: Hebrew Bible
- Date: 1430
- Place of origin: Spain
- Scribe: Rabbi Moses Arragel
- Size: 404 x 288 mm; 515 folios

The Alba Bible also known as the Arragel Bible, was created to foster understanding between Christians and Jews. It is an illuminated manuscript containing a translation of the Hebrew Bible (Old Testament) made directly from Hebrew into mediaeval Castilian. The translation was completed under the supervision of Moses Arragel, who was rabbi of the Jewish community of Maqueda in the Spanish province of Toledo. This was done at the request of Grand Master Luis González de Guzmán of the Order of Calatrava. During the antisemitic riots of 1430, the Alba Bible was created. Arragel initially hesitated due to the unrest, but ultimately chose to assist Guzman in translating and interpreting the manuscript. This collaborative process lasted eight years, from 1422 to 1430.

After the fall of Granada in 1492, the Spanish Inquisition led to the expulsion of Jews from Spain and the destruction of many books. The Alba Bible was one of the few that was spared, hidden among society's elites and passed down through generations.

The Alba Bible is currently displayed in the House of Alba in Liria, Madrid. In 1992, five hundred facsimile copies were made to mark five hundred years since the expulsion of the Jewish population from Spain. The original has 515 folios while the facsimile editions contain 513 folios.

The first 25 folios were expressed in an argument made by Arragels on his reluctance to accept the position. They worked on with a collaborative effort with Christians also involved in the making. The Bible was produced in the Spanish provinces of Toledo. The work has 334 miniatures. Of these miniatures, six are full-page works. The Bible's uniqueness stems from its incorporation of Christian and rabbinical texts, and accompanying images. More biblical contex can be found alongside rabbinical imagery. Some of the descriptions listed in this Bible are deeply connected with Jewish backgrounds and iconography. Such miniatures as the menorahs, the parting of the Red Sea, the Zeal of Phineas, and images of circumcision.

The Alba Bible’s significance is that it is a response to antisemitism, and its patron who initiated the creation of this bible for the purpose of extending an olive branch. There is also a significance in the way it was written using the vernacular or common language instead of an overly formal language.

== History ==
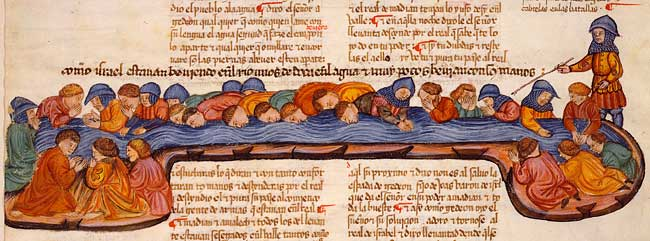
Folio 183v of miniature depicting people drinking from a river with their hands.

=== Origins ===
During the 15th century, many people within Spanish society held hostile views toward Jews. In the aftermath of a series of anti-Jewish riots centered in Madrid, Don Luis de Guzmán believed that he could help heal the rift and build a bridge of understanding between Christians and Jews by commissioning a Castilian translation of the Old Testament from the original Hebrew, accompanied by commentary from Jewish scholars interpreting the text of their holy book.

On April 5, 1422, Don Luis de Guzmán initiated his project by sending a letter to rabbi Moses Arragel inviting him to compose "vna biblia en rromançe, glosada e ystoriada." It is unknown what convinced Rabbi Arragel to accept as he initially hesitated in an extensive reply letter to Guzmán. Nevertheless, eight years later the bible was completed.

=== Religious Context in Spain ===
After the fall of Granada on January 2, 1492, Spain's religious tolerance came to an end. Following this event, the Inquisition acted without restraint. Jews who refused to be baptized were compelled to leave the country that year. As a result, Jewish Old Testament translations into Castilian were burned on September 25, 1492. Around twenty Bibles containing heretical writings were publicly burned in Salamanca on the same day.

Meanwhile, the hunt for so-called heretical writings continued, and many copies were kept safe by the highest-ranking members of society. Queen Isabella of Spain, a devout Catholic, possessed at least four different translations. Although she was not the commissioner of the Alba BIble, it was common that such writings would be passed down generationally once in the royal collection.

=== Modern History ===
Today, the original Alba Bible is preserved by the House of Alba and is on exhibition in the Palace of Liria in Madrid. The original Bible has been valued at 2.5 million euros.

In 1992, to commemorate the five hundredth anniversary of the expulsion, Mauricio Hatchwell Toledano, President of the Fundacion Amigos de Sefarad published five hundred copies in an exact facsimile edition, one of which was given to Juan Carlos I of Spain, the reigning King of Spain. Copies of the five hundred were sold for US$44,000.

The whereabouts of the Alba Bible were unknown from 1492, the year the Alhambra Decree was issued mandating the expulsion of all Jews from Spain. It resurfaced in 1622 at the Palace of Liria, owned by the House of Alba. In 1922 an illustrated facsimile edition of three hundred copies was published by the scholar Antonio Paz y Meliá.

==== Stockholm Exhibition ====
During the history of this Bible it was once on display as a Spanish exhibition at the National Museum in Stockholm starting in the winter of 1959 through 1960.

==== Roxburghe Club ====
Between 1918 and 1921, the Duke of Alba gave permission for a printed version of the Alba Bible to be issued. Printed in two volumes, the copies were created using a letter press instead of a facsimile. This was an advantage because it made the Castilian text easier to read. The Roxburghe Club commissioned the facsimile for their personal use.

== Description ==
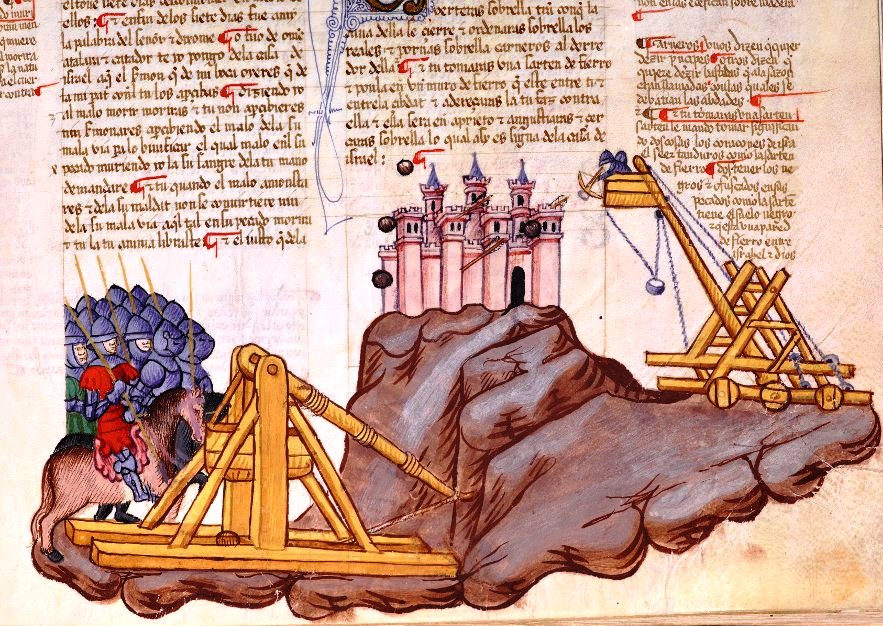
Judas Maccabeus besieging the Acra

The work contains 515 folios. Inserted at the beginning of the work are 25 folios of correspondence between Rabbi Arragel and Don Luís Guzmán as well as between the rabbi and various Franciscans involved in illustrating the translation and discussing matters related to the collaboration. The Rabbi Arragel expressed his hesitancy for the project in these 25 folios, listing concerns about this project and how it may lead to his ruin, or even death. This hesitation may have been well founded as any record of him disappears after the creation of this Bible. It’s not just hesitation that he expressed within the first 25 folios; he also argued that this book should not be completed in the first place, expressing fears that this may even fan the flames of further unrest between the communities that it is intended to help. Eventually Arragel gave in to the demands and agreed to working on the Alba Bible.

The Alba Bible contains a series of comments on the writing of both Jewish and Christian theologians, including Abraham ibn Ezra, Maimonides, Nahmanides, Joseph Kimhi, Asher ben Jehiel, Shlomo ben Aderet, Ya'acob and Nissim of Gerona. There is also commentary taken from rabbinic literary sources such as the Talmud and the Midrash.

=== Collaboration ===
Although the text of the Alba Bible was the product of Rabbi Arragel, the elaborate artistic detail is wholly the product of Franciscans of Toledo. The work contains 334 miniatures that illustrate passages from the religious text. Six of these occupy whole pages. Because this manuscript was the result of a collaboration between the Abrahamic religions, there were significant differences to other Christian Bibles. An example of this would be the miniature depiction of the killing of Abel by Cain. This is described in the Hebrew text that Cain, with snake-like intention, bit the neck of Able thus causing his death. This is depicted clearly in this manuscript being illustrated by one miniature, folio 29v, making it a perfect example of how the differences between this Bible, and many others that are not collaborative.

Although Grand Master Guzman was not directly involved, he appointed two monks to assist Rabbi Moses. Brother Arias was from the monastery in Toledo and through their theological collaboration it is likely that Arragle was able to understand the view of Grand Master Guzmán. Although he would have been aware of classic works and activity such as Aristotle without Christian intervention. His primary reason for work, however, was his rabbinical perspective which widely occupied space within the commentary. Though in isolated cases, these viewpoints were already present and part of Arrangles' plan and can be found in captions alongside the miniatures. However, many of the rabbinical illustrations have no corresponding features within the accompanying text.

== Miniatures ==
=== First Miniature (Fol. 1v) ===
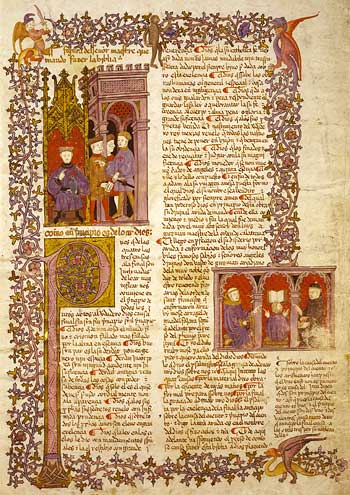
Folio 1v Discussion between Guzmán and Rabbi Moses on the creation of the Alba Bible

The top miniature on folio 1V shows Guzmán sitting in a Gothic courtyard, his left hand making a pointing gesture while his right hand holds a falcon, and a servant holds a letter from Guzmán to Rabbi Moses. The second miniature on folio 1V shows that the rabbi has received the letter and is flanked by two monks.

In addition, this page features interlace coming from the mouths and tails of two dragons. There are also two humanoid beings, one with sword and wings in the right- hand corner and the other in the top middle of the page. The colors on this page are purple, red and yellow.

=== The Parting of the Red Sea (Fol. 68v and 69r) ===
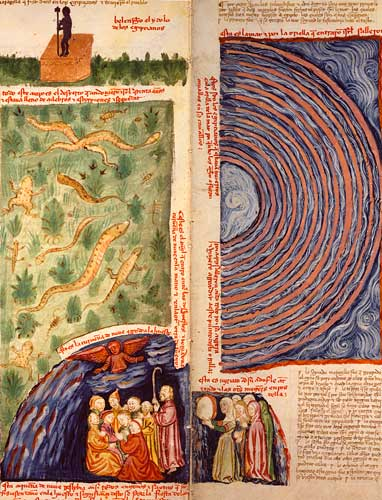
Folio(s) 68v and 69r Parting of the Red Sea

Folios 68v and 69r both tell the story of the parting of the Red Sea as it is usually depicted in Christian art, with iconography influenced by the Jewish Torah. Compared with other Bibles that are likely using the Vulgate as a basis, the Alba Bible directly translates from Hebrew, meaning that the images are more authentically Jewish.

=== Descriptions of Menorahs (Fol. 77r. 88v. 236v.) ===
A noteworthy image of this bible is the menorah featured on folio 77r; the menorah is center of the page, the stem of which extends to the bottom parting text as it reaches down from there; there’s a beveled bowl stand with three legs. The color is primarily pale yellow. There are seven pale red flames. The text is parted yet again within the center of the north menorah, putting the other two columns.

The menorah makes a return in folio, 88v in a full-page image not featuring text. On this page, the colors are gray, yellow, red, and green pictures framed by the military tent. There are also depictions of ritual sacrifice of a horned animal, a chest of some kind, and individuals who do not interact.

Folio 236v is a full-page miniature detailing Solomon's temple in three stories. Each level contains five rooms, with the ground floor room in the middle containing a seven-branched menorah. The scene also represents a sacrifice on the first floor and on top of this scene in another room that shows a high priest with two children. The archway in the middle of this miniature has an inscription discussing the gates of heaven and righteous entry.

=== The Spies with a Cluster of Grapes (Fol. 1008v) ===
A manager featured folio 108V, the spies, with a cluster of grapes which is described in the Bible in verse 23, as being carried by two men. The cluster of grapes is nearly the size of the men themselves. In the image, there are eight men carrying this large cluster of grapes which is carried between two poles with sprouting leaves. It is likely that the inspiration for this image came from the Talmud particularly, Midrash Numbers Rabbah XVI, in which there were also two poles but nothing said about the number of people carrying them.

=== The Zeal of Phinehas (Fol. 127v and 128r) ===
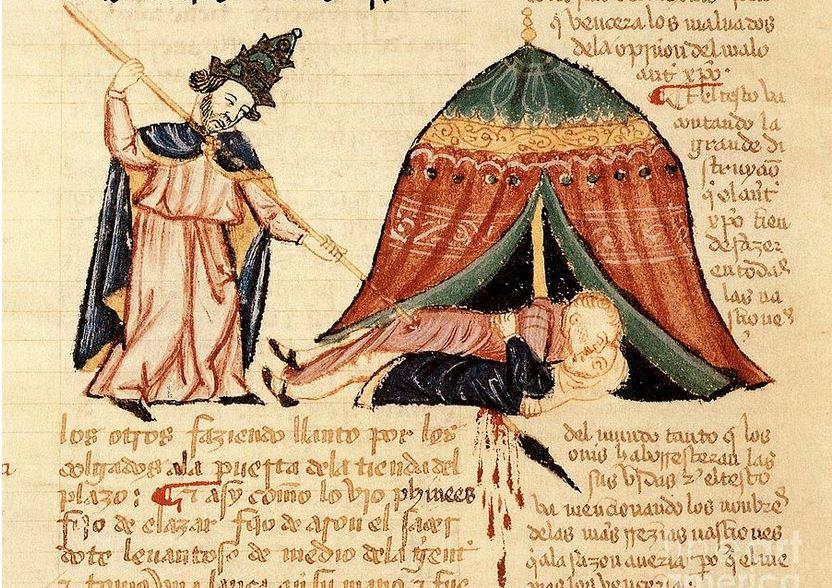
The Zeal of Phinehas

The miniature on folio 127V depicts Phinehas outside the tent of a sinning couple engaged in licentious acts. He then takes his javelin (which was said to belong to Moses) and strikes the couple while they are together, being sure to impale them so that they stay connected. This way there could be no doubt of their sinning. The couple in question is Zimri, a man from Israel, and a Midianitish woman named Cozbi.

The second image on folio 128r shows Phinehas lifting the couple with the strength given to him by angels (one of the nine miracles) to show their sinful coupling to onlookers. The couple only die when Phinheas dislodges his lance from them. After their deaths, the plague that God had created due to their sinning stopped. The thought that the couple only died after the lance was dislodged made it clear that Phinehas was free from sin, or any such wrongdoing. In both images, blood flows from the couple but does not taint Phinehas' clothes (this is a representation of his purity). While there are nine miracles in the story of this Bible, it changes from Bible to Bible, some saying anywhere from six, eight, or as high as twelve miracles happen. Only in the Alba Bible does it say that the blood fell up on the ground in this particular case. Due to a misinterpretation within the text, it is said that there was no blood upon Phinehas, though in many cases' it could be construed as there was no blood at all, that being one of the miracles on this occasion. But since it was thought that the illustrations had been drawn with the blood pouring on the ground before the Bible’s comments were made, there may have been adjustments to the tale.

=== The Circumcisions of the Alba Bible (Fol. 37r and Fol. 167v) ===
Folio 37r depicts Abraham kneeling between two small, rounded trees and bushes, his right foot extended up against the trunk of the tree. He then proceeds to circumcise himself as blood is pouring from the appendage while he drags the knife upward.

Folio 167v shows Joshua circumcising the people. There are mostly bearded men who are un-clothed from the waist down. One of these men is standing completely nude and facing forward, while the other is turned in profile view. His lower half is bleeding as he is being attended to by Joshua, who has a radiating halo of scalloped light. Next to this miniature is a small mound of foreskins and it states that the collection of the sacrifice smelled so sweet that it brought joy to the Lord.

== Significance ==
This Bible was made at a time when there were anti-Semitic riots by the Christian majority against the Jewish minority of Spain. The patron intended to create a conversation, in order to find a way towards an understanding, though this proved to be too ambitious. (citation #'s still need to be fixed)

Another significant part of this Bible was Rabbi Arragel’s use of common language, often using idioms and a turn of phrase popular at this time. As discussed, the type of language used in this Bible meant that it was to be seen by multiple people and there can be an argument made for the ambition of accomplishing a coexistence among the Jewish and Christian population. This common vernacular also contains a historical record of what these particular turns of phrases were at this time, and it is an excellent vessel for the study of that vernacular.

== See also ==
- Cloisters Hebrew Bible
- Damascus Crown
- Kennicott Bible
- Golden Haggadah
