= Cloisters Hebrew Bible =

14th century Hebrew Bible codex

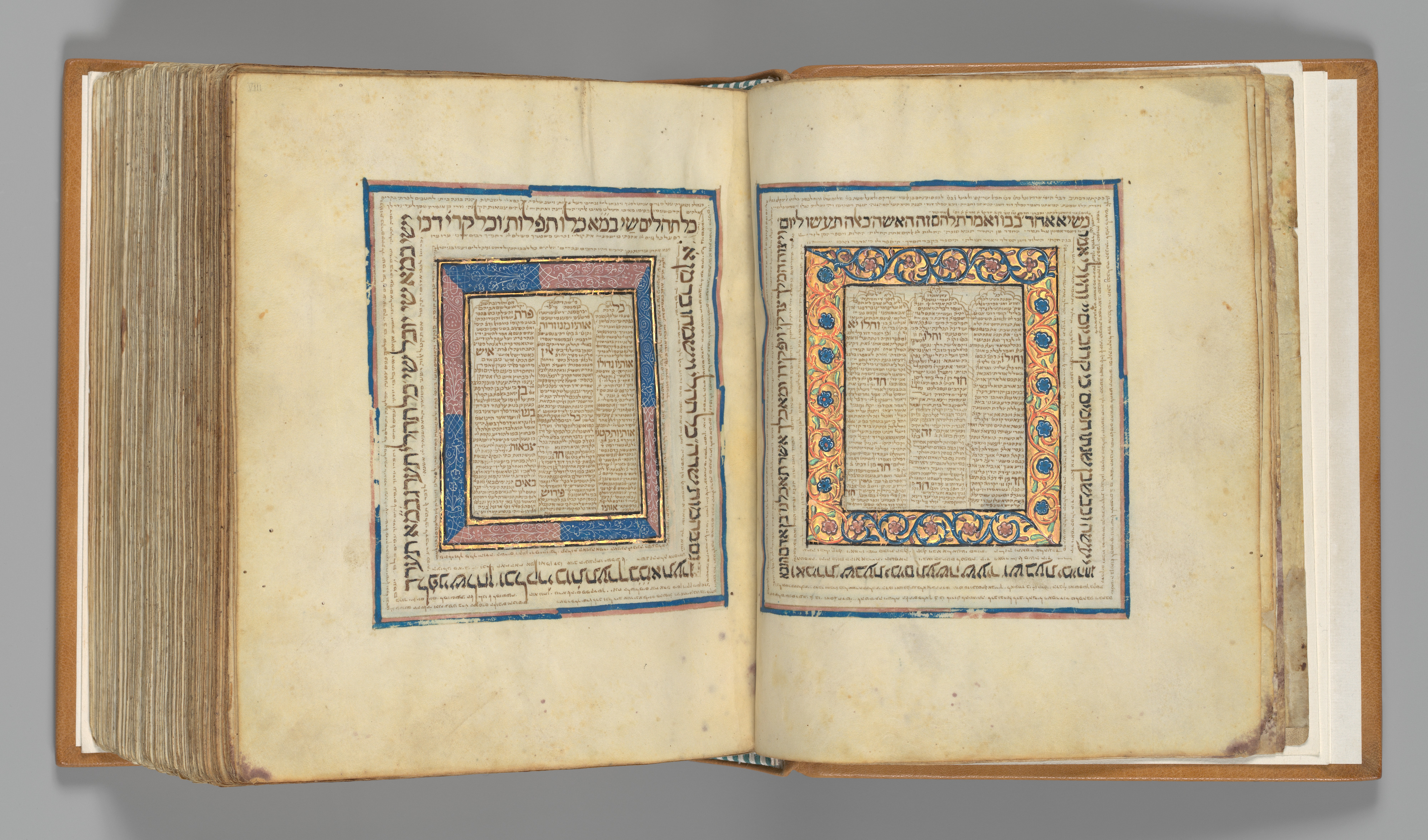
Page from the Cloisters Hebrew Bible

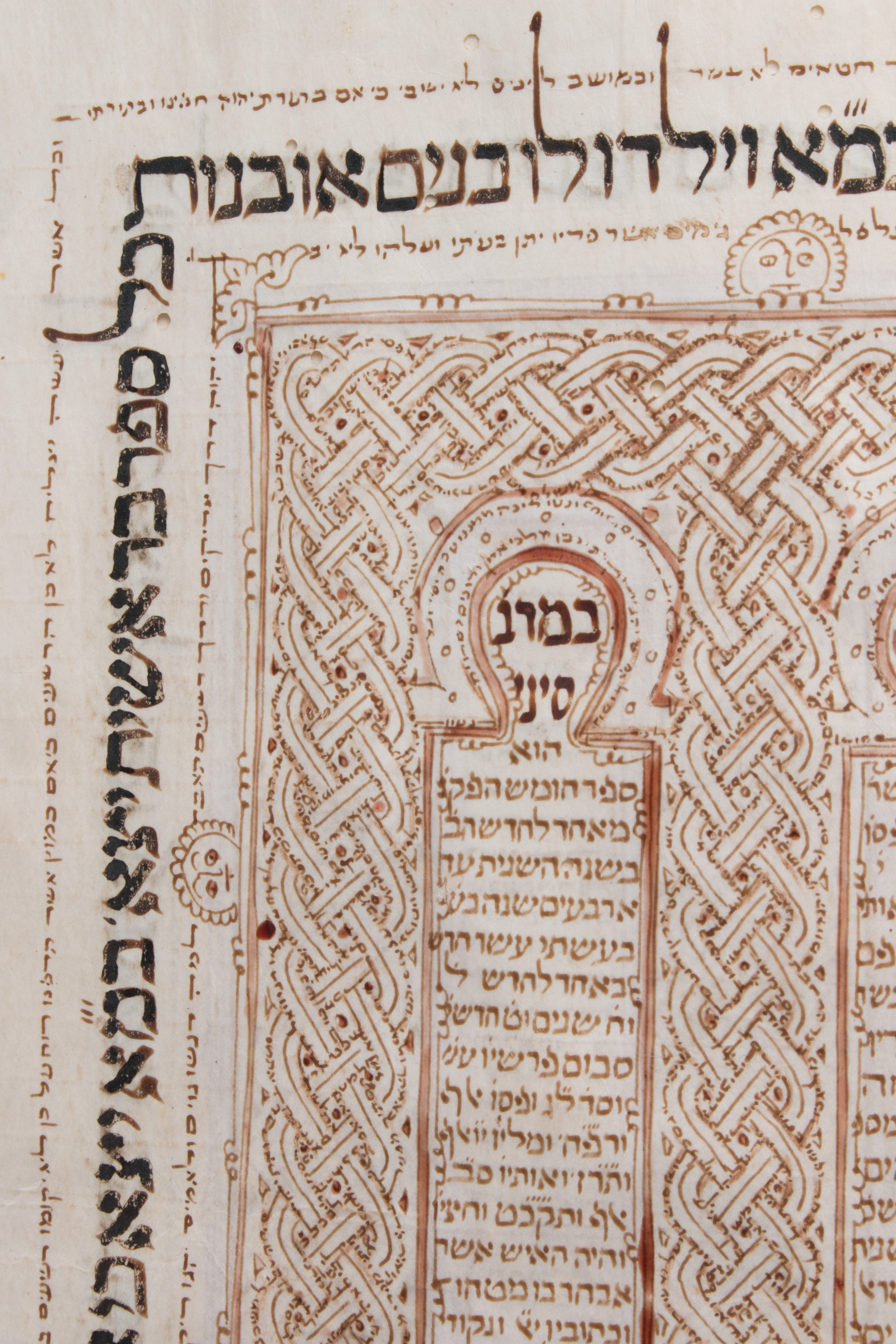
Page from the Cloisters Hebrew Bible

The Cloisters Hebrew Bible is a Hebrew Bible codex made in the Kingdom of Castile from the early to mid-14th century, with an approximate date prior to 1366. The Metropolitan Museum of Art acquired this manuscript from the collection of Jacqui Safra from Sotheby's Judaica auction on 20 December 2017.

== History ==
Hebrew Bibles were produced in Castile during the 1230s, during the reign of Ferdinand III. The era of manuscript making came to an end due to the Black Plague and the Massacre of 1391, followed by the Alhambra Decree and the expulsion of the Jewish communities in Portugal.

After the expulsion of Jews, the manuscript remained in Thessaloniki for centuries, followed by Alexandria before coming into the hands of Jacqui Safra. The manuscript was placed on auction by Safra through Sotheby's Judaica Auction on 20 December 2017, with an estimate of $3.5-5 million but it was purchased by the MET pre-auction for an undisclosed amount.

It is now part of the Cloisters collection, under accession number 2018.59.

== Manuscript ==
The manuscript consist of 476 folios. The first part of the manuscript is heavily gilded 70 folios are decorated with micrography, and the six of the micrographic pages are decorated with horseshoe and double-horseshoes frames. The manuscript is noted to be heavily influenced by Mudéjar and Gothic Design, which was prominent within the Iberian Peninsula. The combination of Judaic, Islamic, and Christian art styles has come to be known as convivencia.

It is one of only three surviving illuminated Hebrew Bibles from fourteenth-century Castile.

== Provenance ==
The earliest known date on the codex is dated to 1366, with the owner's signature: David ha-Kohen Coutinh[o].

Other owners of the book include:

- Moses Abulafia (late 1400s-early 1500s)
- Donna Jamila of Salonika (1526)
- Aaron di Boton of Salonika (1526)
- The Zaradel Synagogue of Alexandria (by 1905)
- Central European Private Collector (circa 1950s/60s to 1996)
- Jacqui E. Safra (sold to MET in 2018)

== See also ==
- Alba Bible
- Kennicott Bible
- Damascus Crown
- Golden Haggadah
- Lisbon Bible
- List of Hebrew Bible manuscripts
