= Moisés Arragel =

Spanish rabbi and compiler of Arragel Bible

Moses Arragel
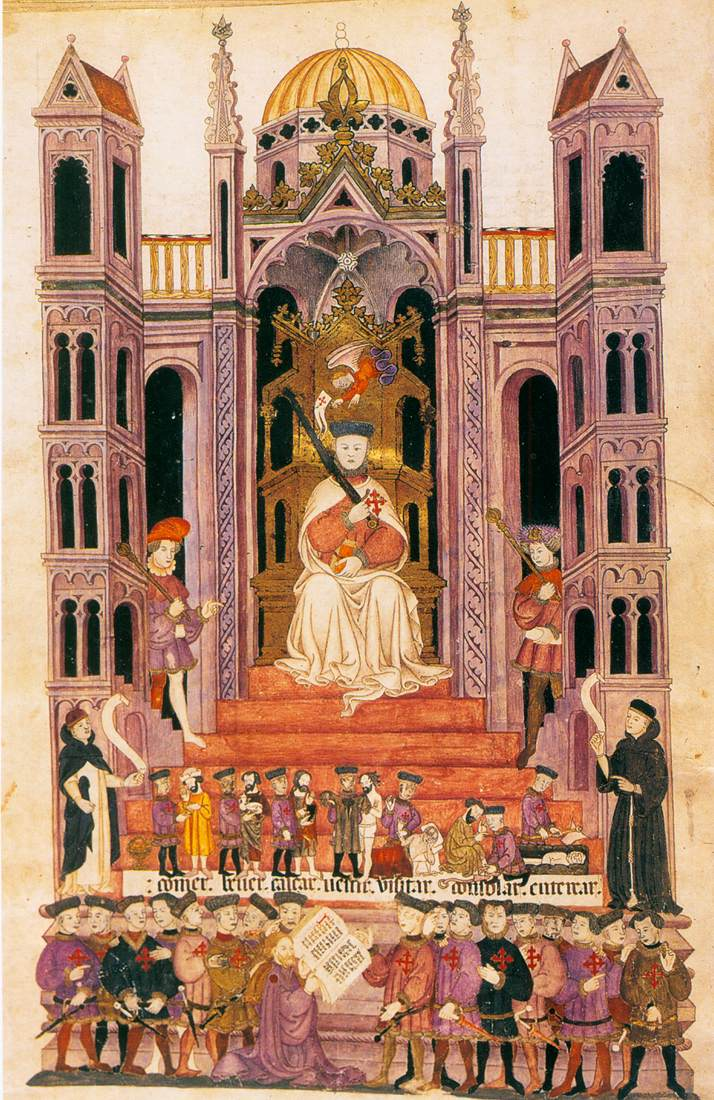
- Presentation miniature depicting Rabbi Moses handing over the manuscript to Luis de Guzmán.
- Title: Rabbi

Personal life
- Born: 1400 Guadalajara, Spain
- Died: 1493 (aged 92–93)
- Notable work: Arragel Bible

Religious life
- Religion: Judaism

Rabbi Moisés Arragel (1400 – 1493) was a Spanish rabbi of the fifteenth century who was known for translating and compiling the Arragel Bible.

== Biography ==
Arragel was born in the city of Guadalajara, Spain in 1400.

In 1422, Arragel relocated to Maqueda. He would become the rabbi for the community.

Shortly after arriving in Maqueda, Grand Master Luis González de Guzmán of the Order of Calatrava would reach out to Arragel. Don Guzmán sent a letter to Arragel on April 5, 1422 requesting that the rabbi "vna biblia en rromançe, glosada e ystoriada," assist him in creating a Catalan translation of the Old Testament with Jewish Commentary. It is unknown what convinced Rabbi Arragel to accept as he initially hesitated in an extensive reply letter to Don Guzmán, but Arragel ultimately agreed to the project that would eventually be known as the Alba Bible.

Arragel worked on the translation and commentary from 1422 to 1430, in Maqueda with the assistance of two Franciscan monks from Toledo assigned to him by Don Guzmán to do the illustrations. He was careful to remain faithful to the Jewish understanding of the texts and included Midrashic commentary as well. It was completed on June 2, 1430 and presented by Arragel, with much ceremony, to Don Guzmán in Toledo, in the presence of a concourse of prominent and learned men.

Arragel died in the year 1493.
