= Luis González de Guzmán =

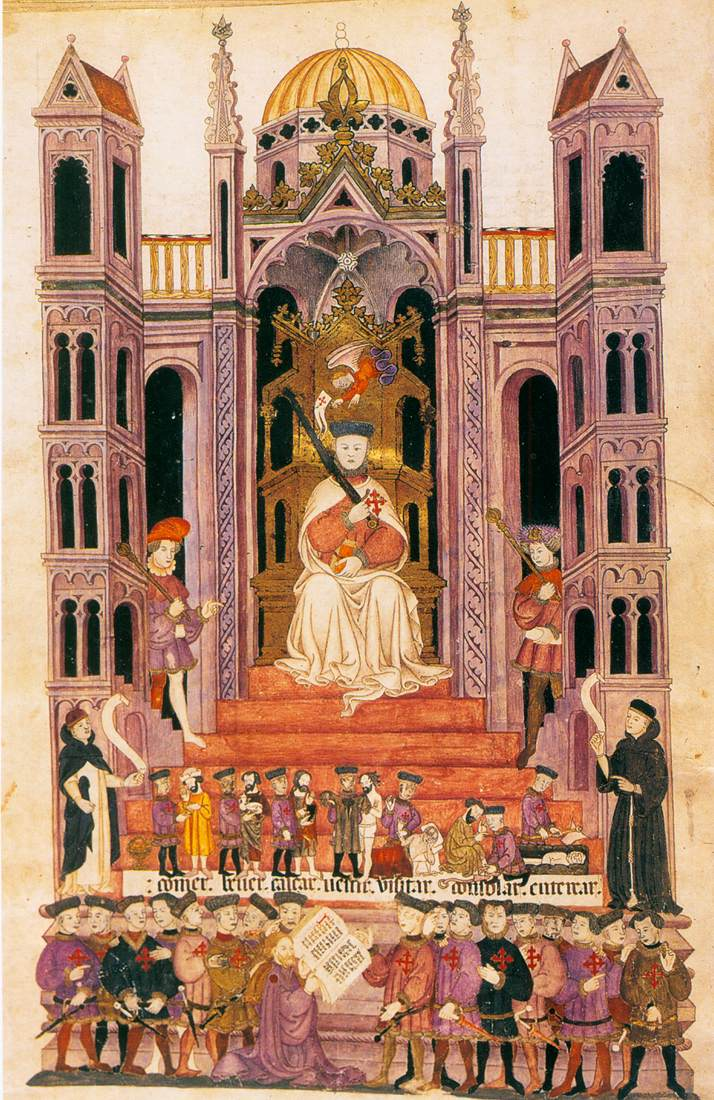
Luis seated in the centre of the presentation miniature of the Alba Bible

Luis González de Guzmán (died 24 February 1443) was a Castilian nobleman and the master of the Order of Calatrava from 1407 until his death.

== Ancestry ==
According to Luis de Salazar y Castro, following earlier genealogists like the Marqués de Mondéjar, José Pellicer and Diego Ortiz de Zúñiga, the parents of Luis González de Guzmán were Gonzalo Núñez de Guzmán, master of the Order of Alcántara and afterwards of Calatrava, and his wife, Isabel Enríquez, the bastard daughter of King Henry II of Castile, whom he wed in secret. Some modern historians affirm this parentage.

There is, however, the possibility that Luis González was the nephew rather than the son of his predecessor, as implied by the chronicler Francisco de Rades among others. In this case, his most likely parents were Gonzalo's sister, María Ramírez de Guzmán, and her husband, Juan de Gudiel, as indicated by Fernán Pérez de Guzmán. The researcher Enrique Rodríguez-Picavea Matilla considers it possible that he was passed off as a nephew because the secret marriage of Gonzalo and Isabel was not approved by the king, who threw Gonzalo in prison.

According to Luis de Salazar y Castro, Luis had a brother, Pedro Núñez de Guzmán, who served as the cupbearer of King Ferdinand I of Aragon.

== Biography ==
Luis was a member of the Order of Calatrava from a young age. On the death of Gonzalo Núñez in 1404, he was elected grand commander. He was not elected master because King Henry III of Castile imposed Henry of Villena, as master against canon law. Luis went into voluntary exile in late 1404, settling in Alcañiz, in the Order's lands in Aragon.

Following the death of Henry III in December 1406, the section of the Order withdrew its obedience from Henry of Villena and elected Luis master. This caused a sometimes violent schism in the Order that was not completely healed until 1416, although the pope found in favour of Luis in 1414.

While his position as master was still disputed, Luis participated in the offensive launched by the regent, Ferdinand of Antequera, against the Kingdom of Granada in 1406–1410. He was present at the siege of Setenil in 1407.

Luis was an ally of Álvaro de Luna in his return to power in 1429. For his support, the Order received major exemptions from the crown. He readily joined Luna's crusade against Granada in 1431. At the battle of La Higueruela, he commanded 800 knights, 160 of them belonging to the Order, and 1,000 infantry. In 1432, he was enfeoffed with Andújar, confiscated from Henry of Villena. His presence was decisive. He was not present, although his grand commander was, at the battle of Guadix in May 1435.

He died on 24 February 1443 at Almagro after a long illness. He was buried in the centre of the main chapel of the castle of Calatrava la Nueva.

== Marriage and issue ==
In 1439, Pope Eugene IV commuted the vow of perpetual chastity of the knights of Calatrava into a vow of conjugal chastity, permitting the knights to marry. Luis married and had five children: Juan, Pedro, Luis, Fernando and Inés. Juan inherited the lordship of Arjona, which he later exchanged for that of La Algaba.

== Alba Bible ==
One of Luis's most visible legacies is the Alba Bible, a deluxe illuminated manuscript of a translation of the Old Testament from Hebrew into Old Spanish. The translation was commissioned by Luis from Moisés Arragel, a Jewish rabbi. In the full-page presentation miniature showing Arragel handing over his work, Luis is presented almost as enthroned royalty.

== Bibliography ==
- Ayala Martínez, Carlos de (2022). "González de Guzmán, Luis". Diccionario Biográfico Español. Real Academia de la Historia.
- Porro, Nelly R. (1989). "Un conde palatino en la Corte de Juan II". Anales de la Universidad de Chile. Estudios en honor de Alamiro de Ávila Martel (20). Santiago de Chile: Universidad de Chile: Vicerrectoría de Extensión y Comunicaciones: 201–207. ISSN 0717-8883.
- Rodríguez-Picavea Matilla, Enrique (2005a). "Linaje y poder en la Castilla Trastámara. El ejemplo de la Orden de Calatrava". Anuario de estudios medievales (35–1). Madrid: Consejo Superior de Investigaciones Científicas, CSIC: Institución Milá y Fontanals. Departamento de Estudios Medievales: 91–130. ISSN 0066-5061.
- Rodríguez-Picavea Matilla, Enrique (2005b). "Prosopografía de la Orden de Calatrava en Castilla: la primera mitad del siglo XV" (PDF). Meridies: Revista de historia medieval (7). Córdoba: Universidad de Córdoba: Facultad de Filosofía y Letras: 201–245. ISSN 1137-6015.
- Rodríguez-Picavea Matilla, Enrique; Pérez Monzón, Olga (2006). "Mentalidad, cultura y representación del poder de la nobleza Calatrava en la Castilla del Siglo XV". Hispania: Revista espyearla de historia (222). Madrid: Consejo Superior de Investigaciones Científicas, CSIC: Instituto de Historia y Servicio de Publicaciones: 199–242. ISSN 0018-2141. Archived from the original on 17 October 2014.
- Rodríguez-Picavea Matilla, Enrique (2007). "El proceso de aristocratización de la Orden de Calatrava (siglos XIII-XV)". Hispania sacra (120). Madrid: Consejo Superior de Investigaciones Científicas, CSIC: Instituto de Historia y Servicio de Publicaciones: 493–535. ISSN 0018-215X.
