= Damascus Crown =

13th-century Hebrew codex of the Bible

Damascus Crown (Hebrew: כתר דמשק), Keter Damascus, is a complete Hebrew Bible manuscript containing 24 canonical books written in the 13th century CE, and brought by stealth to Israel from Damascus, Syria in 1993. Today, it is housed at the Hebrew University and National Library of Israel, in Jerusalem, under a public trust. The manuscript is not to be confused with the Damascus Pentateuch.

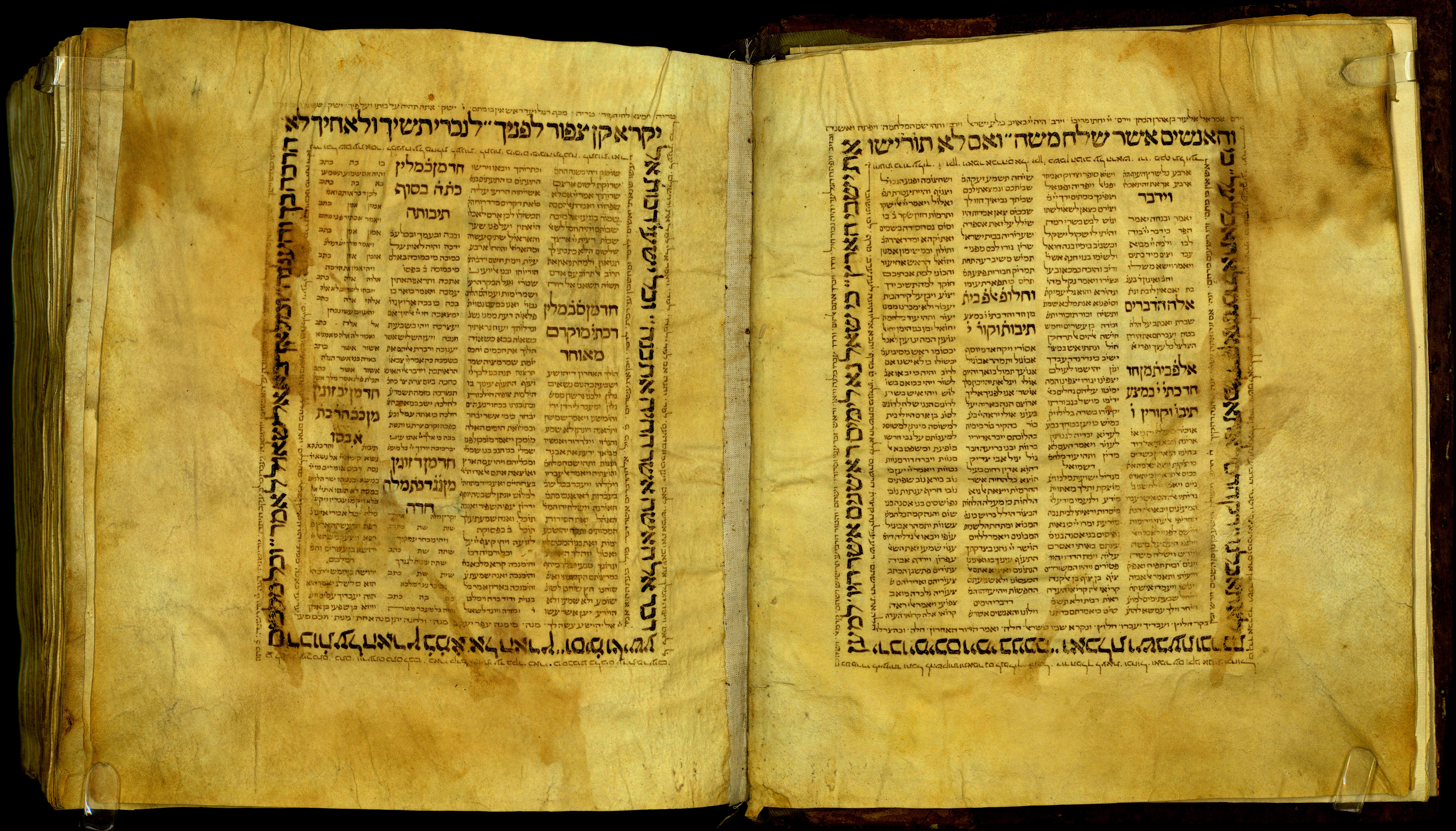
Page 4 of the Damascus Bible

== History ==
According to its colophon, the Damascus Crown was written in 1260 by Menaḥem son of Rabbi Abraham, the son of Malek, in the city of Burgos in Castile (modern-day Spain). The book was transferred to the Khush al-Bâsha al-Anâbi Synagogue in Damascus, Syria, hence the name of the Crown today. Historian and orientalist, Abraham Harkavy, examined the codex when visiting Damascus in 1886. He was followed by Avinoam Yellin in 1919, who also examined the codex.

In 1940 the Crown was stolen from the synagogue, and was discovered again in 1962, and in 1993 was furtively taken out of Syria in an operation whose details remain largely undisclosed to the public, and purchased for the National Library of Israel. Altogether, between 1993 and 1995, nine leather-bound manuscripts containing microscopic calligraphy and decorated with gold leaves, written mostly in Spain and Italy in the 1300s or as early as the 10th-century CE, were secretly brought to Israel. For centuries they were kept inside synagogues in the Syrian capital, and were presented to the public only at special events. The Jews of Damascus treated them with respect and appreciation and ascribed unto them special talisman powers.

One of the carpet pages of the Crown (containing an illustration) was sold at auction in June 1987, and purchased by the Jewish Museum in Toledo, Spain. In August 2020, the Jerusalem District Court ruled that the books were “treasures of the Jewish people” that had “historic, religious and national importance” and must be preserved. The best way to do so would be to keep them at the National Library under a public trust, it ruled. “The trust and its conditions are aimed at ensuring first and foremost the preservation of the Damascus Crowns and their care for the public, the Jewish people and future generations,” the court said.

== Description of manuscript ==
The Crown contains the complete 24 canonical books of the Hebrew Bible, is punctuated in the Tiberian tradition and contains trope symbols (cantillations) and orthographic notes on each page written in micrography, known as the Masora Magna (large Masora), as well as the Masora Parva (small Masora). The codex is written on parchment. It includes 428 pages measuring 350 x 270 mm. The writing is in square Spanish-Hebrew script, three columns per page, except for the books Proverbs, Job and Psalms, which are written in two columns per page.

Between each of the parts of the Bible there is a colorful illustration page. The weekly biblical lections (Sedarim) and pericopes are decorated in gold and other colors.

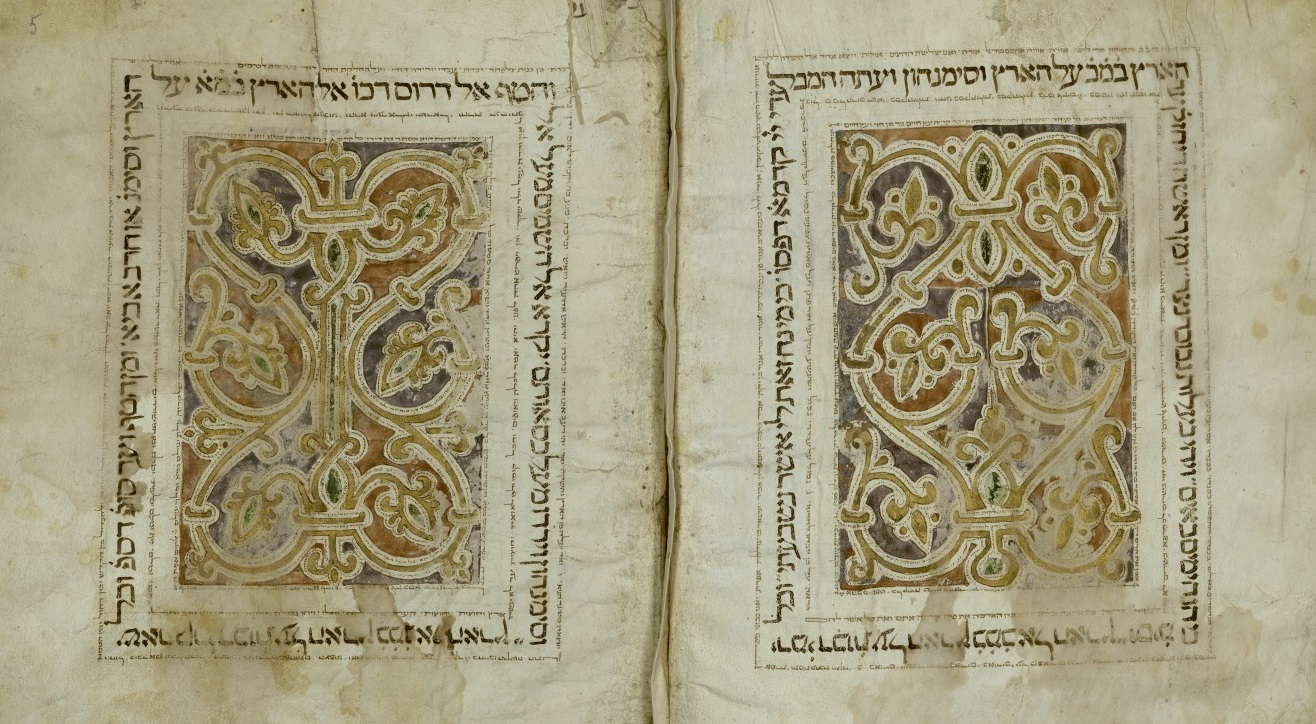
Page 5 of the Damascus Bible

== See also ==
- Alba Bible
- Cloisters Hebrew Bible
- Golden Haggadah
- Kennicott Bible
- Lisbon Bible
- List of Hebrew Bible manuscripts
