= Maqueda =

- Municipality
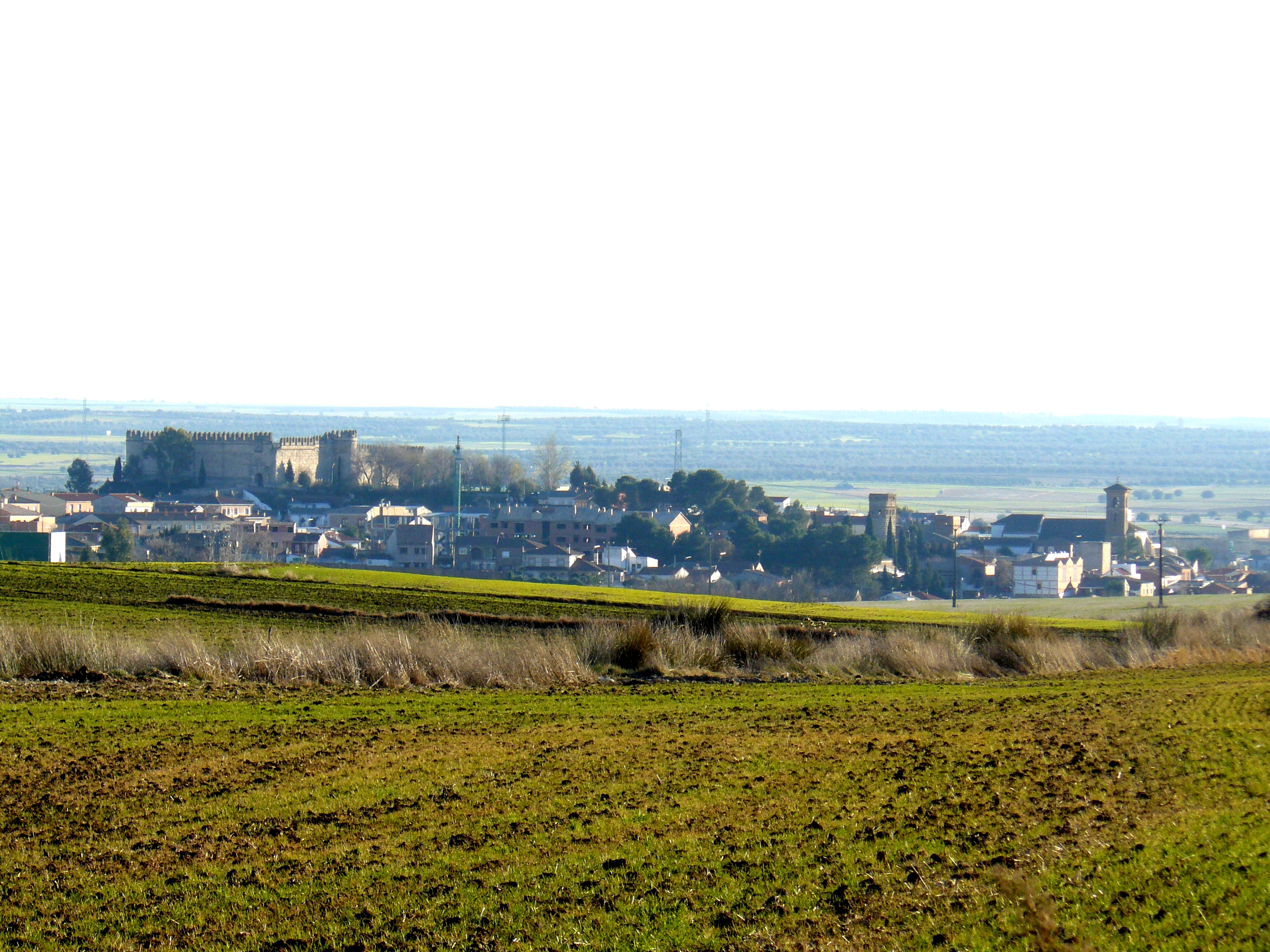
- View of Maqueda

- Flag Coat of arms

- Location in Spain Maqueda (Spain)
- Coordinates: 40°3′53″N 4°22′18″W
- Country: Spain
- Autonomous community: Castile-La Mancha
- Province: Toledo

Government
  - Alcalde: Esteban Ríos Martín (2007)

Area
  - Total: 78 km^{2} (30 sq mi)
- Elevation: 501 m (1,644 ft)

Population (2025-01-01)
  - Total: 548
  - Density: 7.0/km^{2} (18/sq mi)
- Demonym(s): Maquedano, na
- Time zone: UTC+1 (CET)
  - Summer (DST): UTC+2 (CEST)
- Postal code: 45515
- Dialing code: 925

Maqueda is a Spanish town located in the autonomous community Castilla-La Mancha and the province of Toledo, Maqueda is located in the comarca of Torrijos. The town is best known for its remarkably well-preserved castle, the Castillo de la Vela.

== Etymology ==
The name "Maqueda" comes from the root mkd and the Arabic term Maqqada, which means "stable", "firm", or "solid". Other experts believe that the name derives from the root kyd and the Arabic term Makîda, which means "strategically located" or "strong plaza". Because of the similarity with the biblical placename of Makkedah, some Jewish commentators attributed a Jewish origin to the town. The latter claim is categorically rejected by Gonzalo Viñuales Ferreiro.

== History ==
It was fortified under in the 10th century under Abd al-Rahman III. Maqueda passed to control of Castile-León in the context of the conquest of the Taifa of Toledo in 1085, and it was later developed under the initiative of Alfonso VII. The countryside of Maqueda was ravaged in the 1197 Almohad offensive. Maqueda was donated to the Order of Calatrava in June 1201. It received the title of town (villa) in 1324. In the context of the towns of the Alberche riverside in the Western part of the Kingdom of Toledo, Maqueda was of lesser economic and political saliency compared to Talavera and Escalona.

With a Jewish presence recorded since 1222, many Jews installed in the town after 1391 owing to the tolerance espoused by the Calatravan order, with Maqueda thereby becoming the seat of a major jewry in the context of the Archdiocese of Toledo. In 1415, Antipope Benedict XIII ordered the transfer of the town's main synagogue and associated lands to a former Toledan rabbi who had converted to Christianity, after he petitioned for property to sustain his family. The Jewish community seems to have recovered, as the Crown later issued instructions concerning the synagogues of Maqueda. Between 1422 and 1430 the town was also the residence of Rabbi Moses Arragel, known for his Spanish translation of the Bible with commentary, prepared at the request of Don Luis de Guzmán, head of the Order of Calatrava. The Calatravans traded the town to Álvaro de Luna circa 1434–35.

The town was acquired by Gutierre de Cárdenas circa 1482–83.

== The castillo de la vela ==
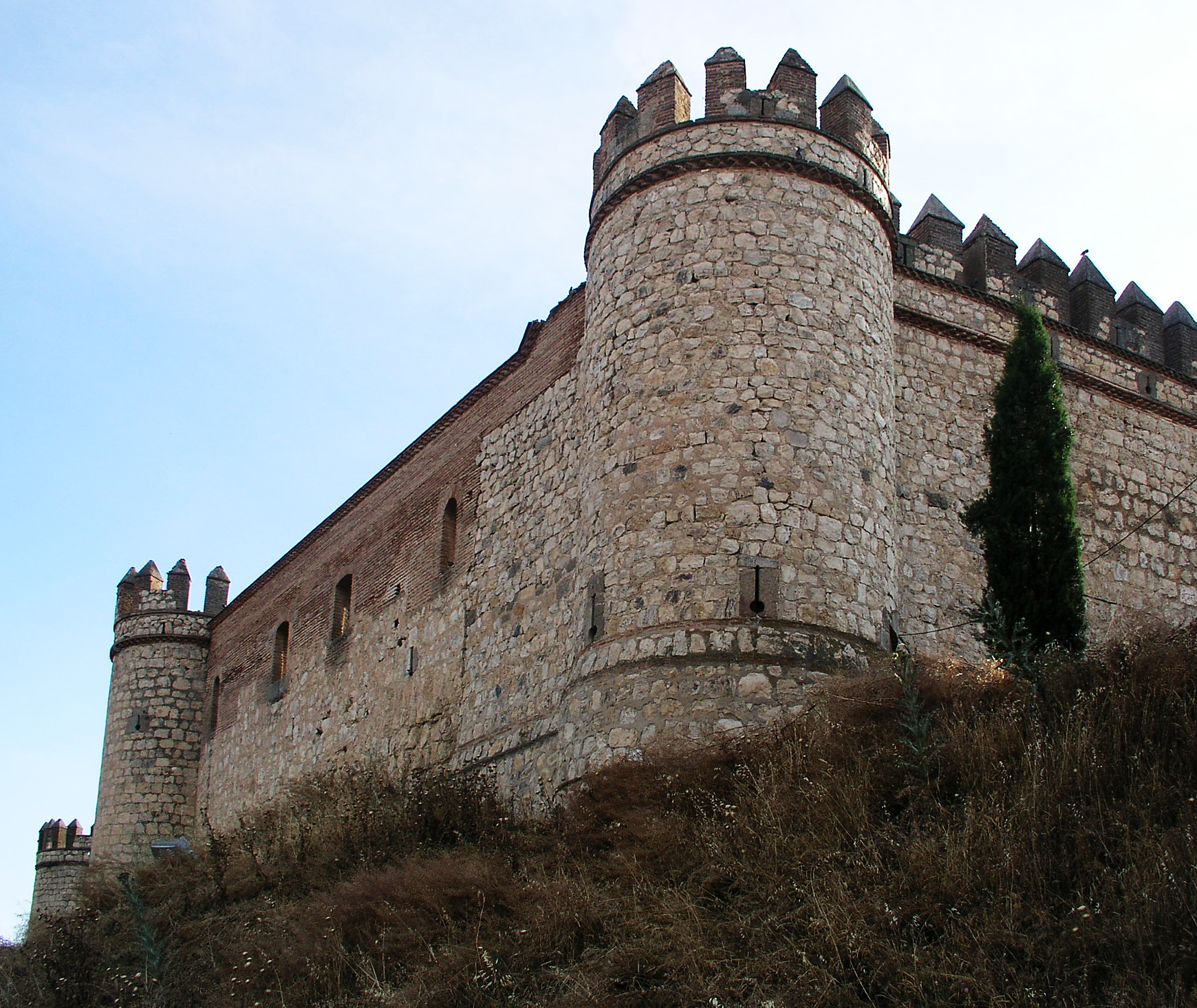
The castillo de la vela, Maqueda

The castillo de la vela, also known as the castillo de Maqueda, is located on the outskirts of town. Originally of Moorish design, the castle was rebuilt and expanded during the 15th century. It was eventually appropriated by the state, which established a Guardia Civil post within the castle and provided for its future conservation.

The castle is rectangular in shape and sits on two distinct elevations. The castle's protections include 3.5-meter-thick walls, moats on two sides, and a number of circular towers. The exterior of the castle is free to visit, though visitors are not permitted to enter the castle proper.

The castle was declared an artistic historical monument on 3 June 1931.
