= Jonah in rabbinic literature =

Allusions in rabbinic literature to the Biblical character Jonah, the unwilling prophet on whom the Book of Jonah centers, contain various expansions, elaborations and inferences beyond what is presented in the text of the Bible itself.

== Early life ==
Jonah's tribal affiliation is disputed; generally assigned to Asher, he is claimed for Zebulun by R. Johanan due to his place of residence. These opinions were harmonized by the assumption that his mother was of Asher while his father was of Zebulun.

According to another authority, his mother was the woman of Zarephath who entertained Elijah. As this prophet, who was also of priestly descent, would have profaned himself if he had touched the corpse of a Jew, it was concluded that this woman, whose son (Jonah) he "took to his bosom" and revived, was a non-Jew.

He received his prophetic appointment from Elisha, under whose orders he anointed Jehu.

He is said to have attained a very advanced age: over 120 years according to Seder Olam Rabbah; 130 according to Sefer Yuchasin; while Ecclesiastes Rabbah 8:10 holds that the son (Jonah) of the Zarephath widow never died.

The "holy spirit" descended on him while he participated in the festivities of the last day of Sukkot. His wife is given as an example of a woman voluntarily assuming duties not incumbent on her, for she is remembered as having made the pilgrimage to Jerusalem on the Shalosh regalim.

== Reason for flight ==
Jonah was induced to flee because, after having won his reputation as a true prophet ("one whose words always came true") by the fulfilment of his prediction in the days of Jeroboam II, he had come to be distrusted and to be called a false prophet, the reason being that when sent to Jerusalem to foretell its doom its inhabitants repented and the disaster did not come.

Knowing that the Ninevites also were on the point of repenting (kerovei teshubah), he anticipated that among them, too, God would earn the reputation of being a false God, or His Shekinah, could not be found.

The phrase in Jonah 3:1, "and the word of God came unto Jonah the second time," is interpreted by Rabbi Akiva, however, to imply that God spoke only twice to him; therefore the "word of God" to him in 2 Kings 14:25 has no reference to a prophecy which Jonah delivered in the days of Jeroboam II, but must be taken in the sense that as at Nineveh Jonah's words changed evil to good, so under Jeroboam, Israel experienced a change of fortune.

When Jonah went to Jaffa he found no ship, for the vessel on which he had intended taking passage had sailed two days before; but God caused a contrary wind to arise and the ship was driven back to port. At this Jonah rejoiced, regarding it as indicating that his plan would succeed, and in his joy he paid his passage-money in advance, contrary to the usual custom, which did not require its payment until the conclusion of the voyage. According to some he even paid the full value of the ship, amounting to 4,000 gold denarii. But all this happened to teach him the fallacy of his conclusion that God could be evaded, for the contrary wind affected his ship only; all others on the sea at that time proceeded uninterruptedly on their courses.

== The ship ==
The storm which overtook Jonah is quoted as one of three most noteworthy storms.

After the sailors' prayers to their idols, as well as their efforts to turn about and lighten the ship, had proved futile, the crew finally was compelled to believe Jonah's statement that this calamity had befallen their craft on his account, and assented to his petition to be thrown overboard. Praying that they might not be held accountable for his death, they first lowered him far enough for the waters to touch his knees. Seeing that the storm subsided, they drew him back into the ship, whereupon the sea at once rose again. They repeated this experiment several times, each time lowering him deeper, but taking him out again, and each time with the same result, until finally they threw him into the sea.

== Fish ==
The fish which swallowed Jonah had been created in the very beginning of the world in order to perform this work. Therefore, this fish had so large a mouth and throat that Jonah found it as easy to pass into its belly as he would have found it to enter the portals of a very large synagogue. It had eyes which were as large as windows, and lamps lit up its interior. According to another opinion, a great pearl suspended in the entrails of the fish enabled Jonah to see all that was in the sea and in the abyss.

The fish informed Jonah that he was to be devoured by Leviathan. Jonah asked to be taken to the monster, when he would save both his own life and that of the fish. Meeting Leviathan, he exhibited the "seal of Abraham," whereupon the monster shot away a distance of two days. To reward him for this service the fish showed Jonah all the wondrous things in the ocean (e.g., the path of the Israelites across the Red Sea; the pillars upon which the earth rests).

Thus he spent three days and three nights in the belly of the fish, but would not pray. God then resolved to put him into another fish where he would be less comfortable. A female fish quick with young approached the male fish in which Jonah was, threatening to devour both unless Jonah were transferred to her, and announcing her divine orders to that effect. Leviathan confirmed her story at the request of both fishes, and then Jonah was ejected from one fish into the over-filled belly of the other. Cramped for room and otherwise made miserable, Jonah finally prayed, acknowledging the futility of his efforts to escape from God.^{Psalms 139} But he was not answered until he had promised to redeem his pledge to capture Leviathan. As soon as God had his promise, He beckoned to the fish and it spat out Jonah upon the dry land, a distance of 968 parasangs (3609 miles).

When the crew of the ship saw this they immediately threw away their idols, sailed back to Joppa, went to Jerusalem, and submitted to circumcision, becoming Jews.

In the Zohar (Vayakhel) it is related that the fish died as soon as Jonah entered, but was revived after three days. When Jonah was thrown into the sea his soul immediately left his body and soared up to God's throne, where it was judged and sent back. As soon as it touched the mouth of the fish on its way back to the body, the fish died, but was later restored to life. The fish's name is given in Shalshelet ha-Kabbalah as cetos ("whale").

The fate of Jonah is allegorized in the Zohar (Vayakhel) as illustrative of the soul's relation to the body and to death. There is the assumption that Jonah is identical with the Moshiach ben Yosef.

The gourd of Jonah was enormous. Before its appearance Jonah was tortured by the heat and by insects of all kinds, his clothes having been burned by the heat of the belly of the fish; he was tortured again after the worm had caused the gourd to wither. This brought Jonah to pray that God should be a merciful ruler, not a strict judge.
