= Illuminated manuscript =

Manuscript in which the text is supplemented by decoration

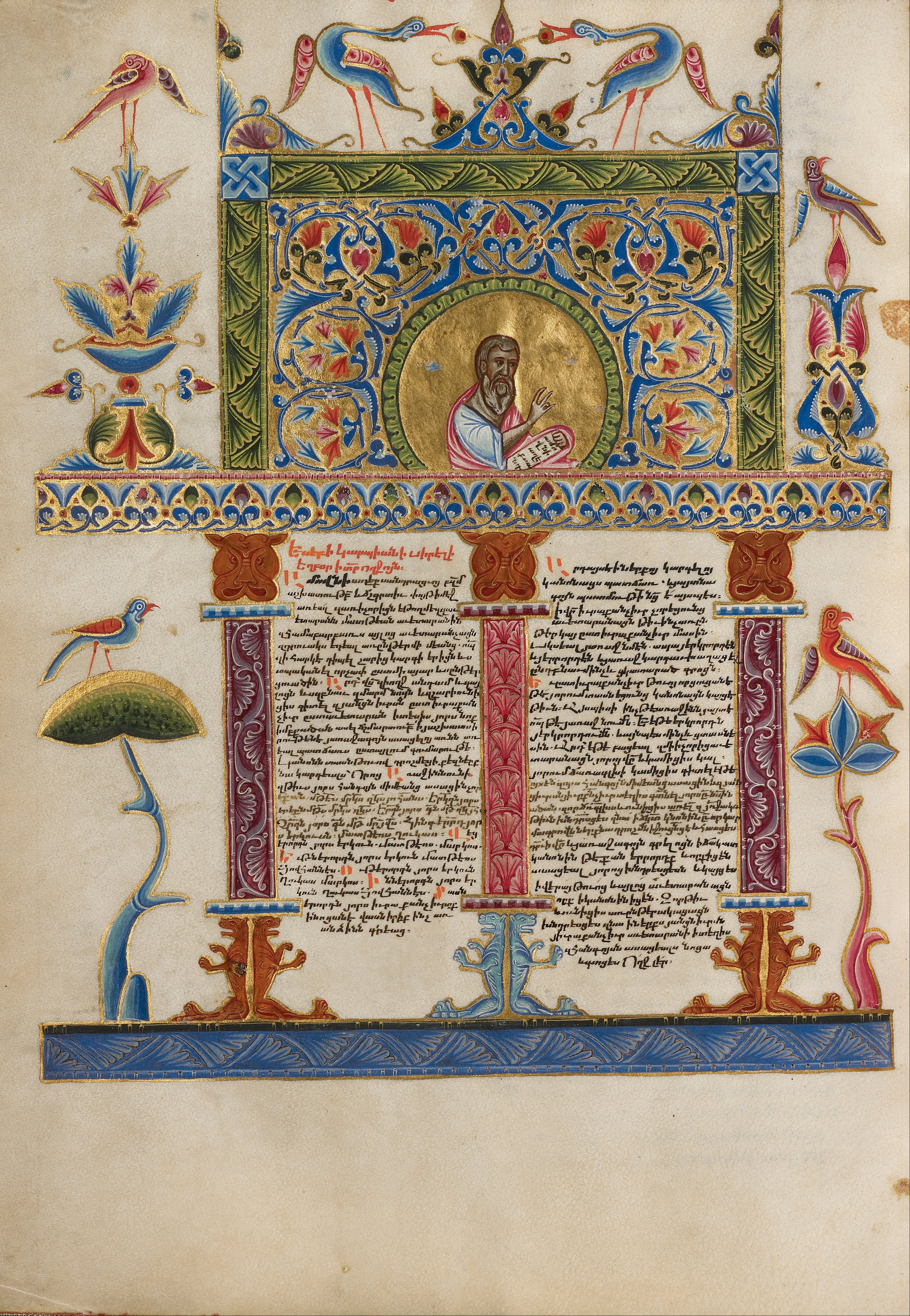
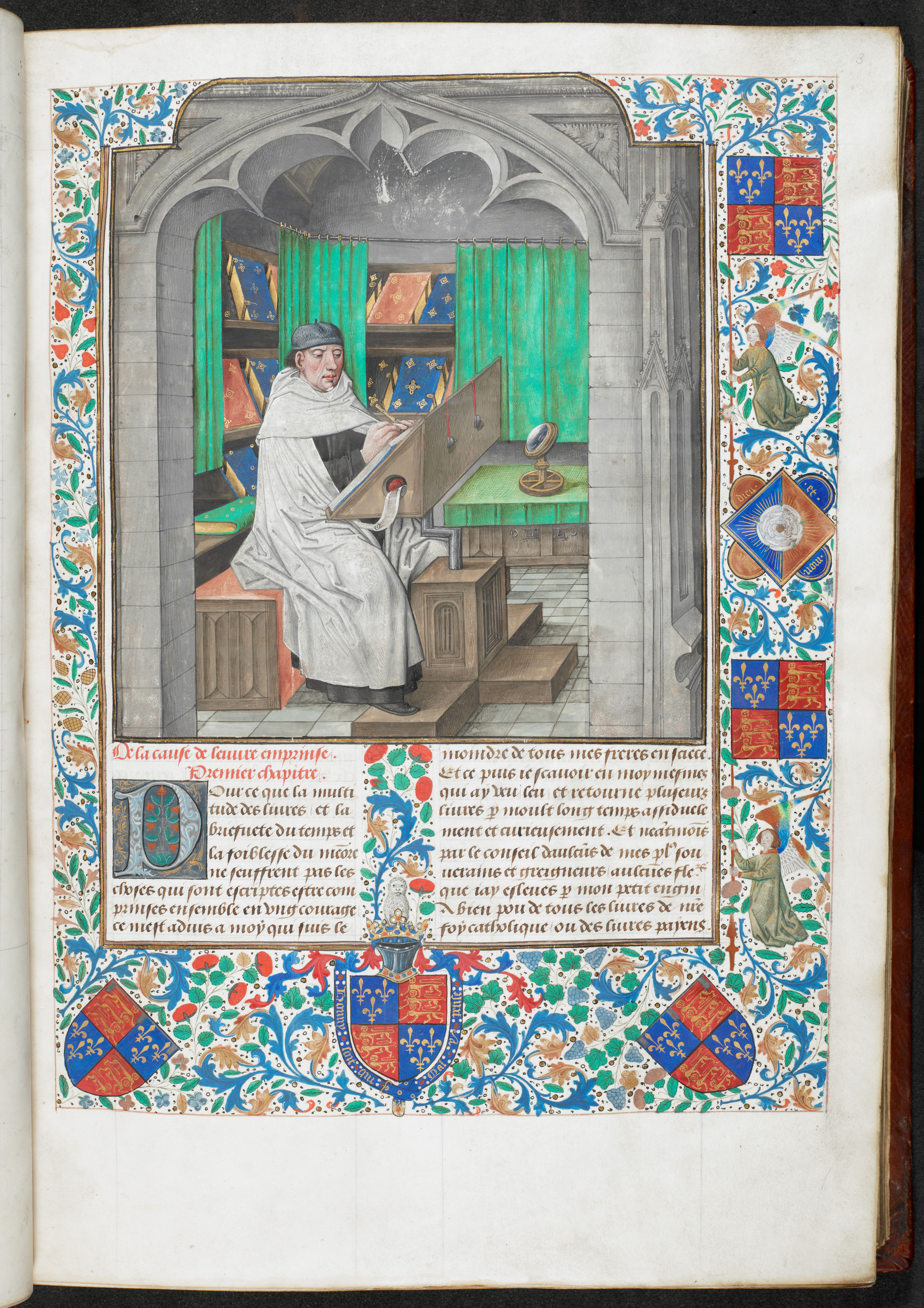
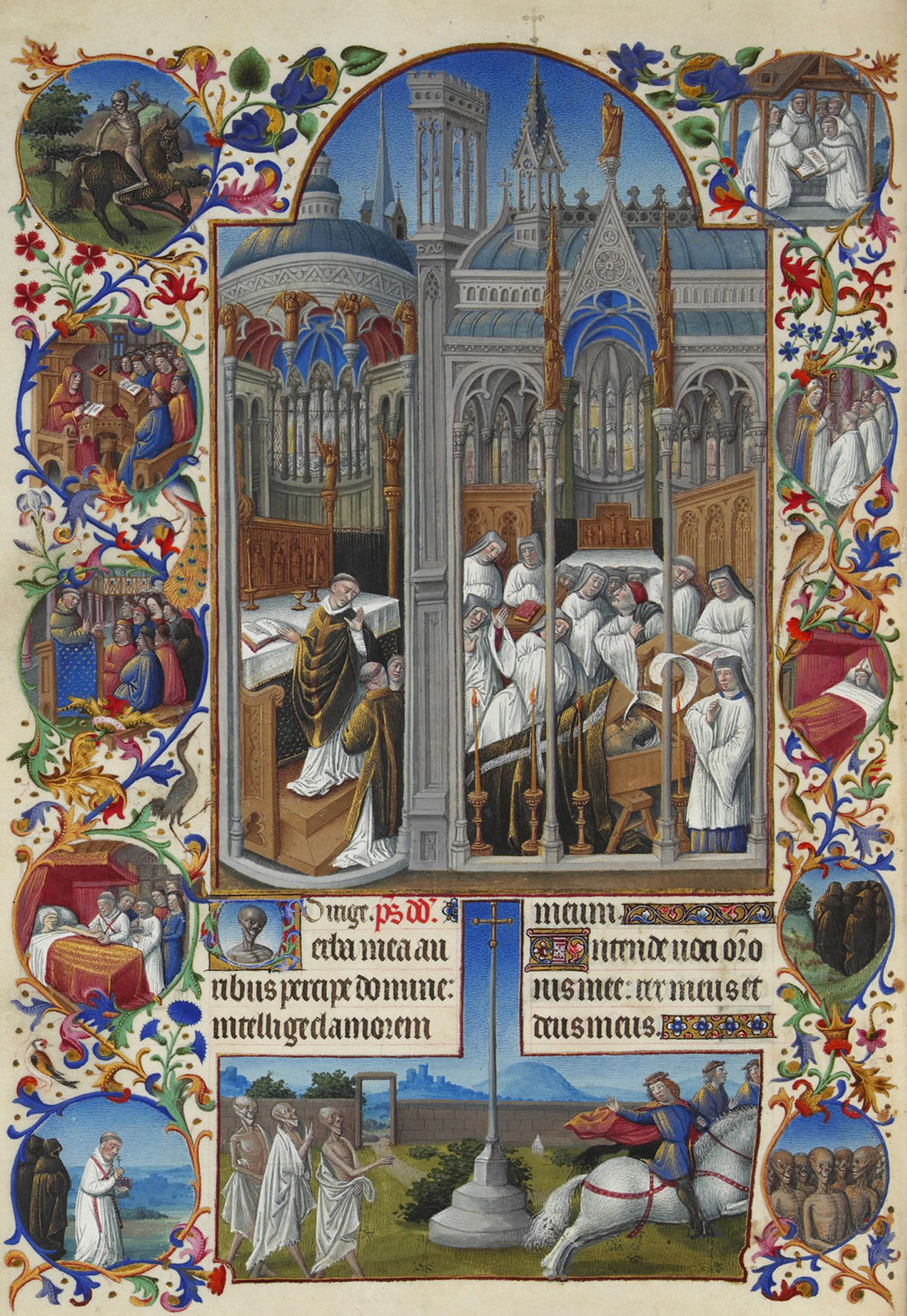
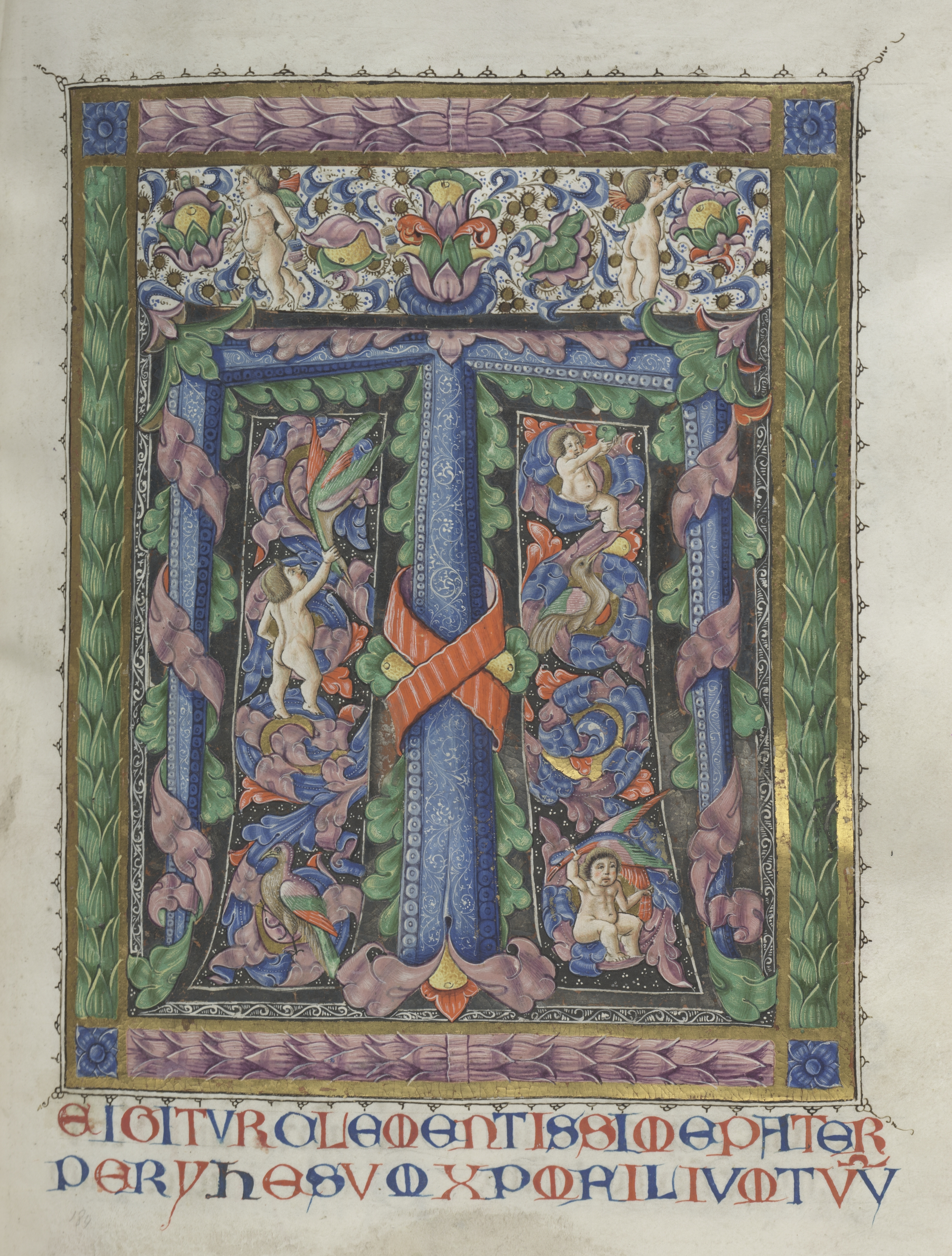
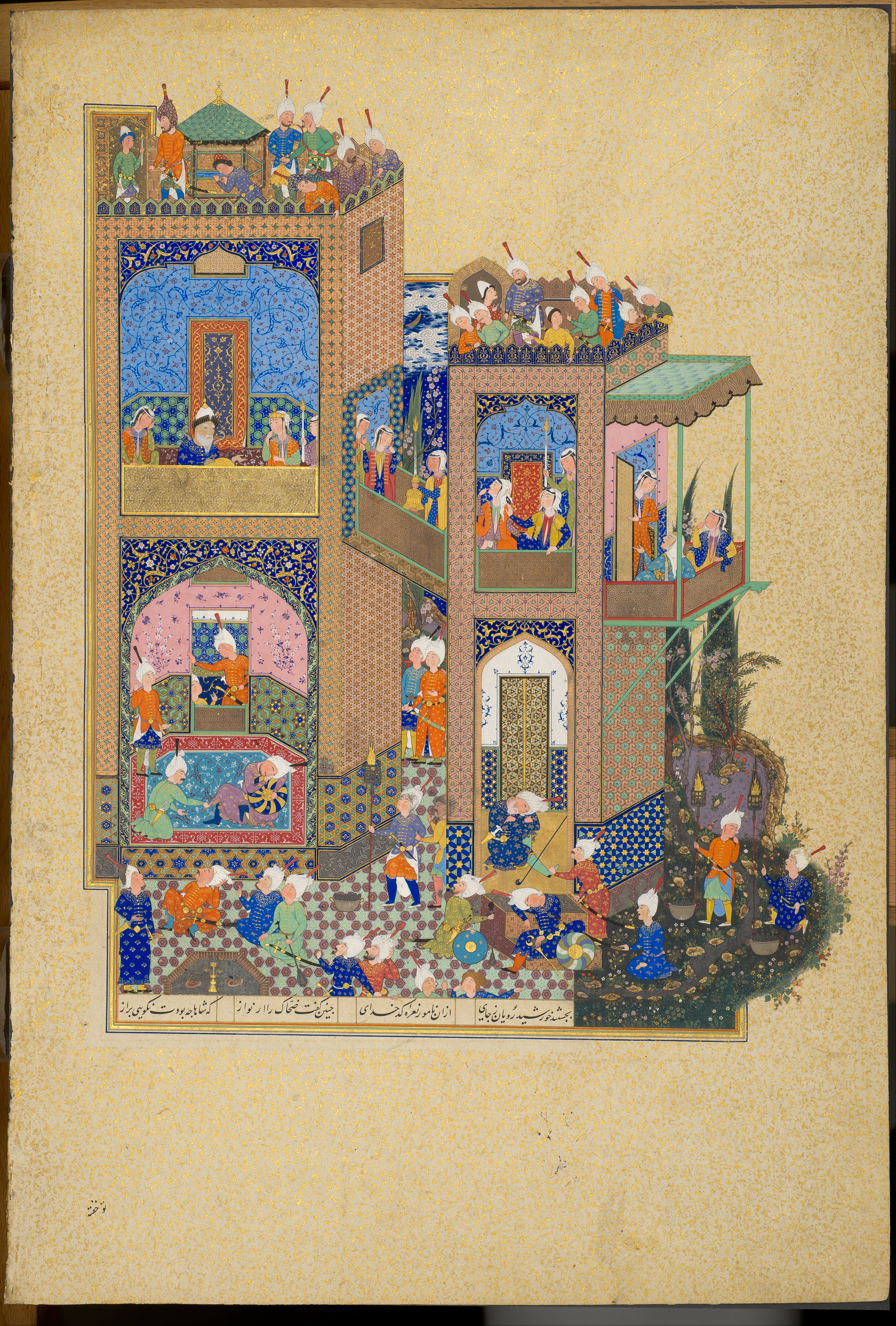
Various examples of pages from illuminated manuscripts

An illuminated manuscript is a formally prepared document where the text is decorated with flourishes such as borders and miniature illustrations. Often used in the Catholic Church for prayers and liturgical books such as psalters and courtly literature, the practice continued into secular texts from the 13th century onward and typically include proclamations, enrolled bills, laws, charters, inventories, and deeds.

The earliest surviving illuminated manuscripts are a small number from late antiquity, and date from between 400 and 600 CE. Examples include the Vergilius Romanus, Vergilius Vaticanus, and the Rossano Gospels. The majority of extant manuscripts are from the Middle Ages, although many survive from the Renaissance. While Islamic manuscripts can also be called illuminated and use essentially the same techniques, comparable Far Eastern and Mesoamerican works are described as painted.

Most manuscripts, illuminated or not, were written on parchment until the 2nd century BCE, when a more refined material called vellum, made from stretched calf skin, was supposedly introduced by King Eumenes II of Pergamum. This gradually became the standard for luxury illuminated manuscripts, although modern scholars are often reluctant to distinguish between parchment and vellum, and the skins of various animals might be used. The pages were then normally bound into codices (singular: codex), that is, the usual modern book format, although sometimes the older scroll format was used, for various reasons. A very few illuminated fragments also survive on papyrus. Books ranged in size from ones smaller than a modern paperback, such as the pocket gospel, to very large ones such as choirbooks for choirs to sing from, and Atlantic bibles, requiring more than one person to lift them.

Paper manuscripts appeared during the Late Middle Ages. The untypically early 11th century Missal of Silos is from Spain, near to Muslim paper manufacturing centres in Al-Andalus. Textual manuscripts on paper become increasingly common, but the more expensive parchment was mostly used for illuminated manuscripts until the end of the period. Very early printed books left spaces for red text, known as rubrics, miniature illustrations and illuminated initials, all of which would have been added later by hand. Drawings in the margins (known as marginalia) would also allow scribes to add their own notes, diagrams, translations, and even comic flourishes.

The introduction of printing rapidly led to the decline of illumination. Illuminated manuscripts continued to be produced in the early 16th century but in much smaller numbers, mostly for the very wealthy. They are among the most common items to survive from the Middle Ages; many thousands survive. They are also the best surviving specimens of medieval painting, and the best preserved. Indeed, for many areas and time periods, they are the only surviving examples of painting.

== History ==
The 63rd page of the Book of Hours (Use of Utrecht), c. 1460–1465, ink, tempera, and gold on vellum, binding: brown Morocco over original wooden boards, overall: 59 × 116 mm, Cleveland Museum of Art (Cleveland, Ohio, US)

=== Latin Europe ===
Art historians classify illuminated manuscripts into their historic periods and types, including (but not limited to) Late Antique, Insular, Carolingian, Ottonian, Romanesque, Gothic, and Renaissance manuscripts. There are a few examples from later periods. Books that are heavily and richly illuminated are sometimes known as "display books" in church contexts, or "luxury manuscripts", especially if secular works. In the first millennium, these were most likely to be Gospel Books, such as the Lindisfarne Gospels and the Book of Kells. The Book of Kells is the most widely recognized illuminated manuscript in the Anglosphere, and is famous for its insular designs. The Romanesque and Gothic periods saw the creation of many large illuminated complete bibles. The largest surviving example of these is The Codex Gigas in Sweden; it is so massive that it takes three librarians to lift it.

Other illuminated liturgical books appeared during and after the Romanesque period. These included psalters, which usually contained all 150 canonical psalms, and small, personal devotional books made for lay people known as books of hours that would separate one's day into eight hours of devotion. These were often richly illuminated with miniatures, decorated initials and floral borders. They were costly and therefore only owned by wealthy patrons, often women.

As the production of manuscripts shifted from monasteries to the public sector during the High Middle Ages, illuminated books began to reflect secular interests. These included short stories, legends of the saints, tales of chivalry, mythological stories, and even accounts of criminal, social or miraculous occurrences. Some of these were also freely used by storytellers and itinerant actors to support their plays. One of the most popular secular texts of the time were bestiaries. These books contained illuminated depictions of various animals, both real and fictional, and often focused on their religious symbolism and significance, as it was a widespread belief in post-classical Europe that animals, and all other organisms on Earth, were manifestations of God. These manuscripts served as both devotional guidance and entertainment for the working class of the Middle Ages.

The Gothic period, which generally saw an increase in the production of illuminated books, also saw more secular works such as chronicles and works of literature illuminated. Wealthy people began to build up personal libraries; Philip the Bold probably had the largest personal library of his time in the mid-15th century, is estimated to have had about 600 illuminated manuscripts, whilst a number of his friends and relations had several dozen. Wealthy patrons, however, could have personal prayer books made especially for them, usually in the form of richly illuminated "books of hours", which set down prayers appropriate for various times in the liturgical day. One of the best known examples is the extravagant Très Riches Heures du Duc de Berry for a French prince.

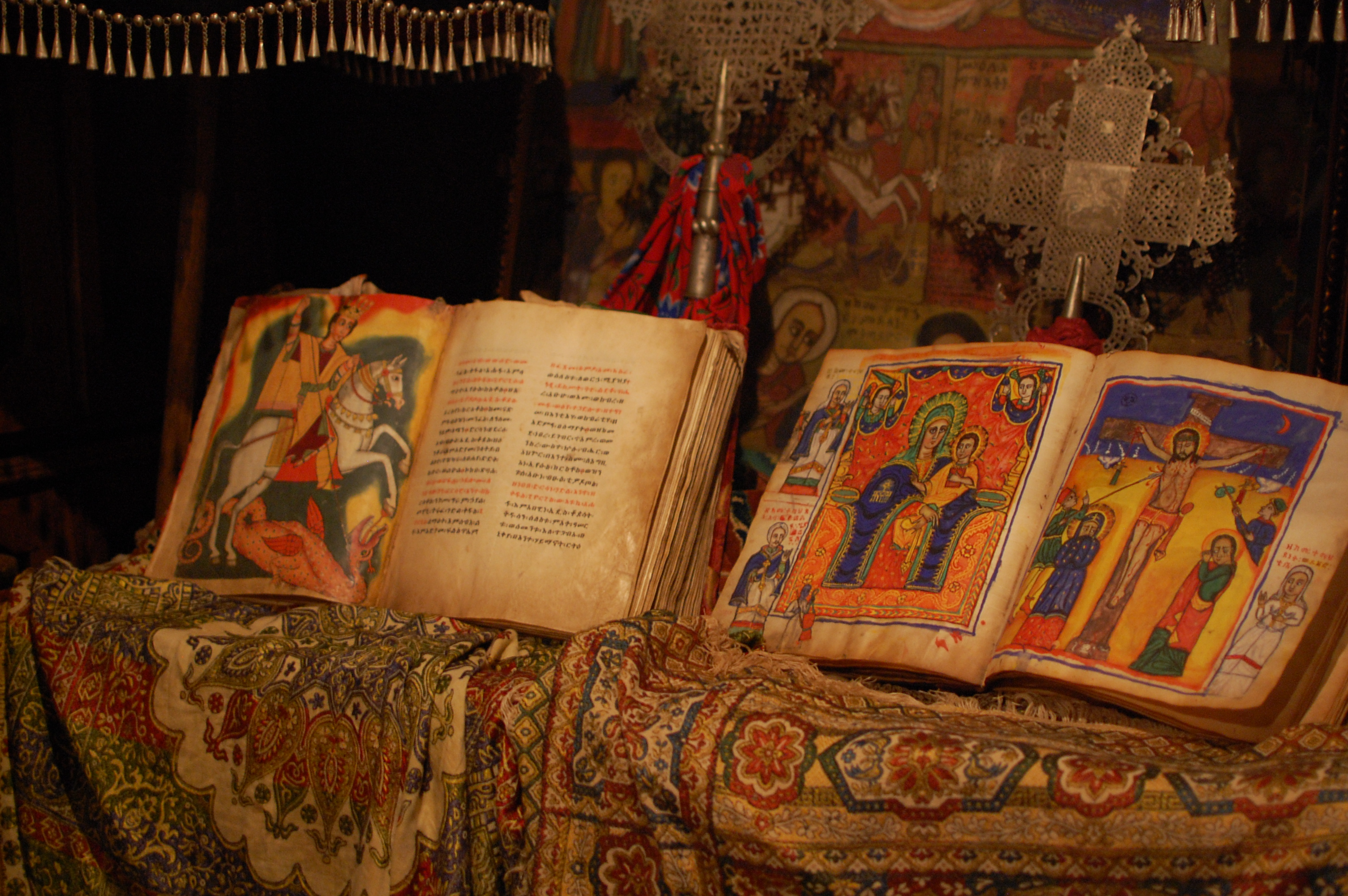
Illuminated manuscripts housed in the 16th-century Ethiopian Orthodox Church of Ura Kidane Mehret, Zege Peninsula, Lake Tana, Ethiopia

Up to the 12th century, most manuscripts were produced in monasteries in order to add to the library or after receiving a commission from a wealthy patron. Larger monasteries often contained separate areas for the monks who specialized in the production of manuscripts called a scriptorium. Within the walls of a scriptorium were individualized areas where a monk could sit and work on a manuscript without being disturbed by his fellow brethren. If no scriptorium was available, then "separate little rooms were assigned to book copying; they were situated in such a way that each scribe had to himself a window open to the cloister walk."

By the 14th century, the cloisters of monks writing in the scriptorium had almost fully given way to commercial urban scriptoria, especially in Paris, Rome and the Netherlands. While the process of creating an illuminated manuscript did not change, the move from monasteries to commercial settings was a radical step. Demand for manuscripts grew to an extent that monastic libraries began to employ secular scribes and illuminators. These individuals often lived close to the monastery and, in instances, dressed as monks whenever they entered the monastery, but were allowed to leave at the end of the day. Illuminators were often well known and acclaimed and many of their identities have survived.

The Illuminated Chronicle from the court of King Louis the Great of Hungary from 1358

=== Greek Europe and the Islamic world ===
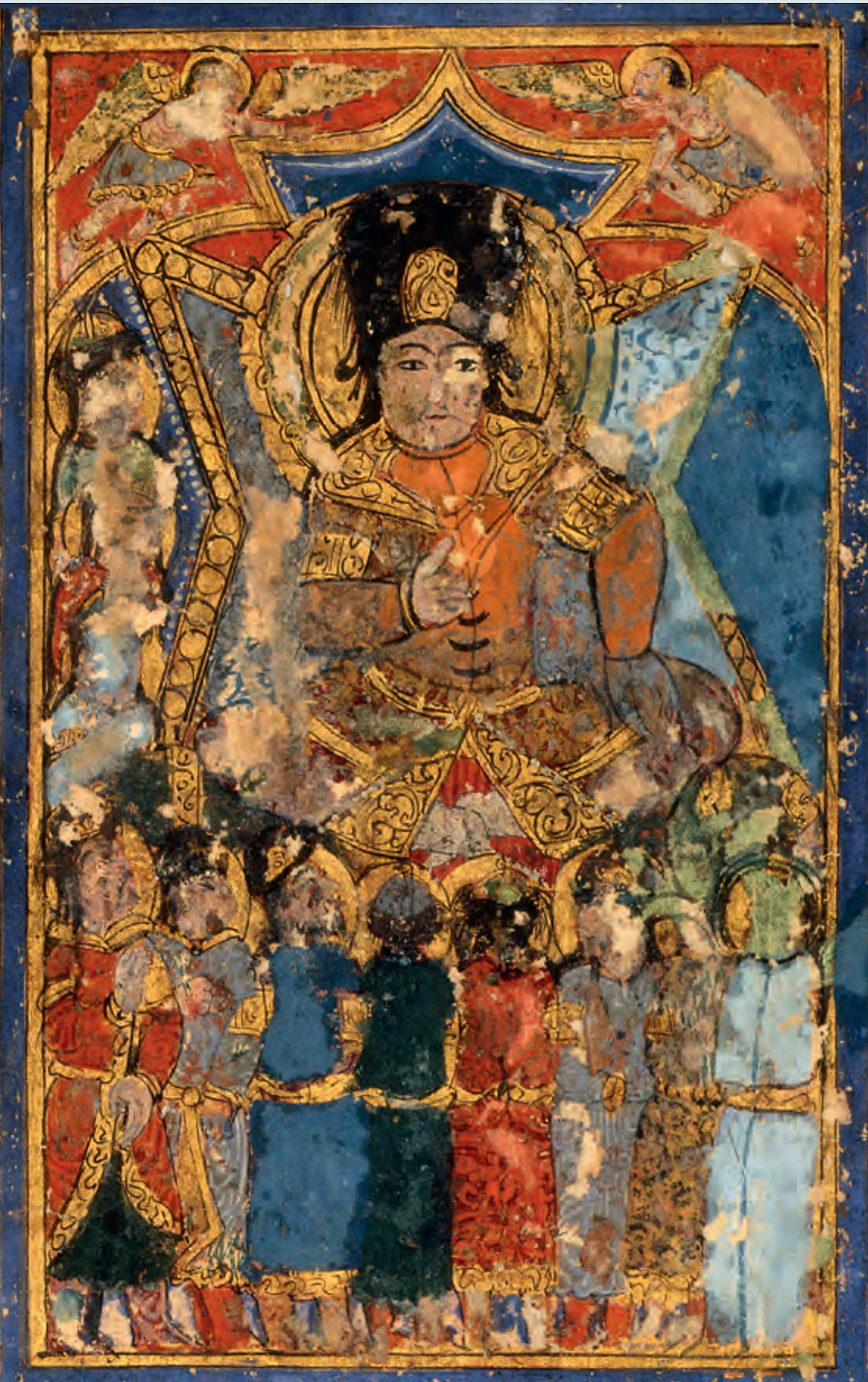
Frontispiece of the Maqamat al-Hariri (1237 CE) depicting a ruler in Turkic dress (long braids, Sharbush fur hat, boots, fitting coat), possibly Baghdad.

The Byzantine world produced manuscripts in its own style, versions of which spread to other Orthodox and Eastern Christian areas. This distinct Byzantine style of illumination had a characteristic color palette along with different ways of preparing pigments and ink and a unique finish to the vellum writing surface which was not as conducive to long term preservation as the more texture Western style. With their traditions of literacy uninterrupted by the Middle Ages, the Muslim world, especially on the Iberian Peninsula, was instrumental in delivering ancient classic works to the growing intellectual circles and universities of Western Europe throughout the 12th century. Books were produced there in large numbers and on paper for the first time in Europe, and with them full treatises on the sciences, especially astrology and medicine where illumination was required to have profuse and accurate representations with the text.

The origins of the pictorial tradition of Arabic illustrated manuscripts are uncertain. The first known decorated manuscripts are some Qur'ans from the 9th century. They were not illustrated, but were "illuminated" with decorations of the frontispieces or headings. The tradition of illustrated manuscripts started with the Graeco-Arabic translation movement and the creation of scientific and technical treatises often based on Greek scientific knowledge, such as the Arabic versions of The Book of Fixed Stars (965 CE), De materia medica or Book of the Ten Treatises of the Eye. The translators were most often Arab Syriac Christians, such as Hunayn ibn Ishaq or Yahya ibn Adi, and their work is known to have been sponsored by local rulers, such as the Artuqids.

An explosion of artistic production in Arabic manuscripts occurred in the 12th and especially the 13th century. Thus various Syriac manuscripts of the twelfth and thirteenth centuries, such as Syriac Gospels, Vatican Library, Syr. 559 or Syriac Gospels, British Library, Add. 7170, were derived from the Byzantine tradition, yet stylistically have a lot in common with Islamic illustrated manuscripts such as the Maqāmāt al-Ḥarīrī, pointing to a common pictorial tradition that existed since circa 1180 in Syria and Iraq which was highly influenced by Byzantine art. Some of the illustrations of these manuscript have been characterized as "illustration byzantine traitée à la manière arabe" ("Byzantine illustration treated in the Arab style").

The Persian miniature tradition mostly began in whole books, rather than single pages for muraqqas or albums, as later became more common. The Great Mongol Shahnameh, probably from the 1330s, is a very early manuscript of one of the most common works for grand illustrated books in Persian courts.

=== Jewish ===
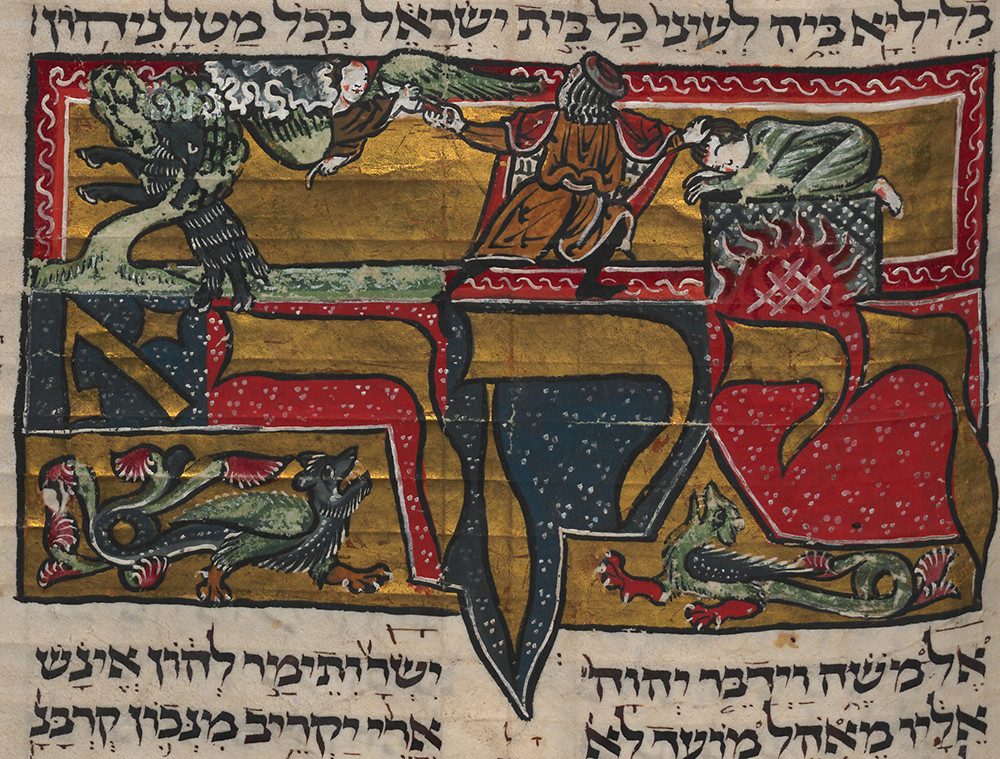
Sacrifice of Isaac, opening of Leviticus, detail of fol. 102r, Ambrosian Tanakh, made in Germany, ca. 1236–38, Biblioteca Ambrosiana

A number of Jewish religious manuscripts were illustrated and include representational art, with figures such as Joel ben Simeon becoming known for their work. Archival records from medieval Iberia confirm that Jews were painters and practitioners of the fine arts. A number of works survive.

Some illustrations from the Middle Ages feature fantastic creatures—usually animal-headed humanoids, even when the depictions are quite clearly meant to be those of historical or mythological humans, known as zoocephalic figures. A well-known example is the Birds' Head Haggadah (Germany, circa 1300). Although it is theorized that zoocephalic art is to circumvent a prohibition of aniconism in Judaism, understood to prohibit idolatry, the fact that some manuscripts also include human faces casts doubt on this assumption. The reasons for this illustration style are not fully understood.

The Ambrosian Bible or Ambrosian Tanakh of 1236 by Jacob ben Samuel and Joseph ben Kalonymus is one of the earliest Ashkenazic illuminated manuscripts and biblical codices. It contains figural representation and depictions of biblical figures such as Adam and Eve, Abraham, Isaac, Jacob or Joseph, Moses, Solomon, David and others. Some of the figures appear with faces obscured or zoocephalic. It was made for a patron probably from Ulm.

The Leipzig Mahzor also employs a zoocephalic method to depict humans.

== Techniques ==
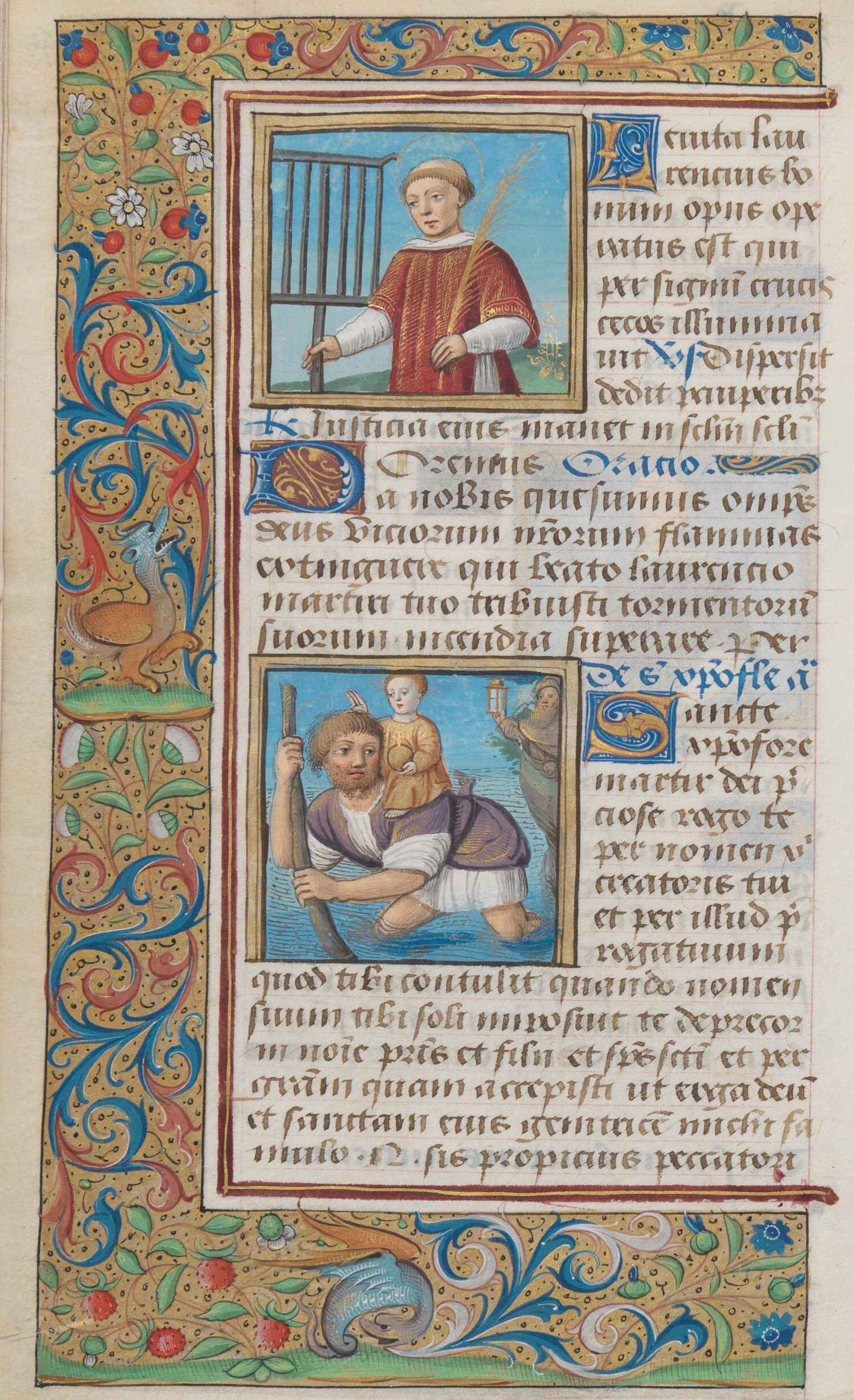
Page from a Latin book of hours, with miniatures of saints. Book of Hours of Alexandre Petau, 16th century, Rouen, well after printing had become more common.

Styles and techniques of manuscript illumination varied by region, and there were distinct differences in aspects like color palette, decoration style, and peak periods of output. Certain places like the Celtic regions specialized in more ornamental details in contrast to the Byzantine pictorial designs, and regions such as Flanders were more prolific in manuscript production much later than other places.

Illumination was a complex and costly process, and was therefore usually reserved for special books such as altar bibles, or books for royalty. Heavily illuminated manuscripts are often called "luxury manuscripts" for this reason. In the early Middle Ages, most books were produced in monasteries, whether for their own use, for presentation, or for a commission. These monks would work as a collective group to sponsor the patronage of a manuscript, but that in turn shielded their identites somewhat from history: there are more numerous surviving signatures on works from the scibe and less from the illustrations, but often there is simply the signature of the patron monastery. However, commercial scriptoria grew up in large cities, especially Paris, and in Italy and the Netherlands, and by the late 14th century there was a significant industry producing manuscripts, including agents who would take long-distance commissions, with details of the heraldry of the buyer and the saints of personal interest to him (for the calendar of a book of hours). By the end of the period, many of the painters were women, especially painting the elaborate borders, and perhaps especially in Paris.

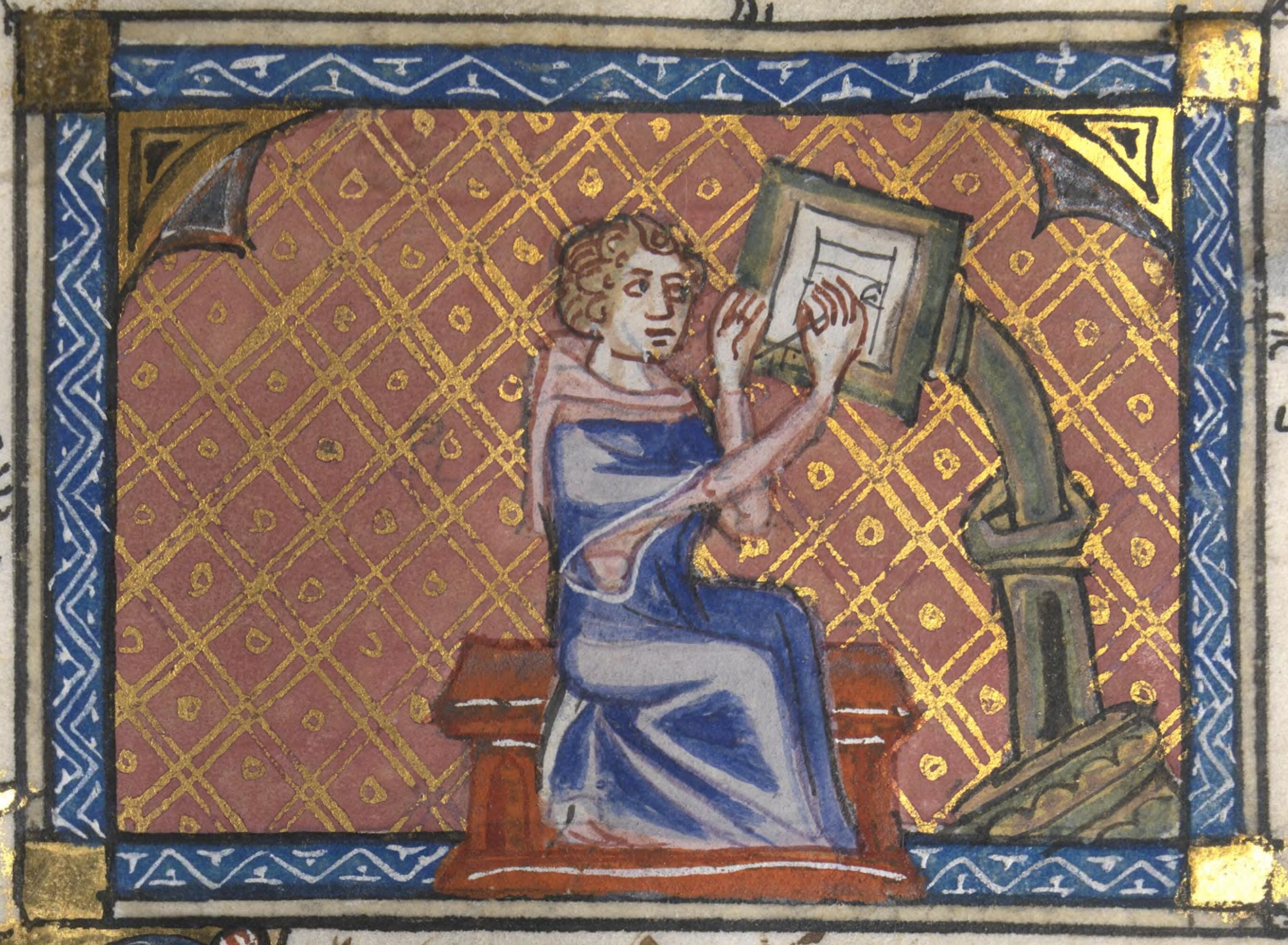
The author of a manuscript at his writing desk. 14th century

=== Text ===
The type of script depended on local customs and tastes. In England, for example, Textura was widely used from the 12th to 16th centuries, while a cursive hand known as Anglicana emerged around 1260 for business documents. In the Frankish Empire, Carolingian minuscule emerged under the vast educational program of Charlemagne.

The first step was to send the manuscript to a rubricator, "who added (in red or other colors) the titles, headlines, the initials of chapters and sections, the notes and so on; and then – if the book was to be illustrated – it was sent to the illuminator". These letters and notes would be applied using an ink-pot and either a sharpened quill feather or a reed pen. In the case of manuscripts that were sold commercially, the writing would "undoubtedly have been discussed initially between the patron and the scribe (or the scribe's agent, but by the time the written gathering were sent off to the illuminator, there was no longer any scope for innovation.)"

The sturdy Roman letters of the early Middle Ages gradually gave way to scripts such as Uncial and half-Uncial, especially in the British Isles, where distinctive scripts such as insular majuscule and insular minuscule developed. Stocky, richly textured blackletter was first seen around the 13th century and was particularly popular in the later Middle Ages. Prior to the days of such careful planning, "A typical black-letter page of these Gothic years would show a page in which the lettering was cramped and crowded into a format dominated by huge ornamented capitals that descended from uncial forms or by illustrations". To prevent such poorly made manuscripts and illuminations from occurring, a script was typically supplied first, "and blank spaces were left for the decoration. This presupposes very careful planning by the scribe even before he put pen to parchment."

=== Engrossing: The process of illumination ===
A common process of manuscripts illumination from the creation of the quire to the binding

ENGROSSING I. Charcoal powder dots create the outline II. Silverpoint drawing is sketched III. Illustration is retraced with ink IV. The surface is prepared for the application of gold leaf V. Gold leaf is laid down VI. Gold leaf is burnished to make it glossy and reflective VII. Decorative impressions are made to adhere the leaf VIII. Base colors are applied IX. Darker tones are used to give volume X. Further details are drawn XI. Lighter colors are used to add particulars XII. Ink borders are traced to finalize the illumination

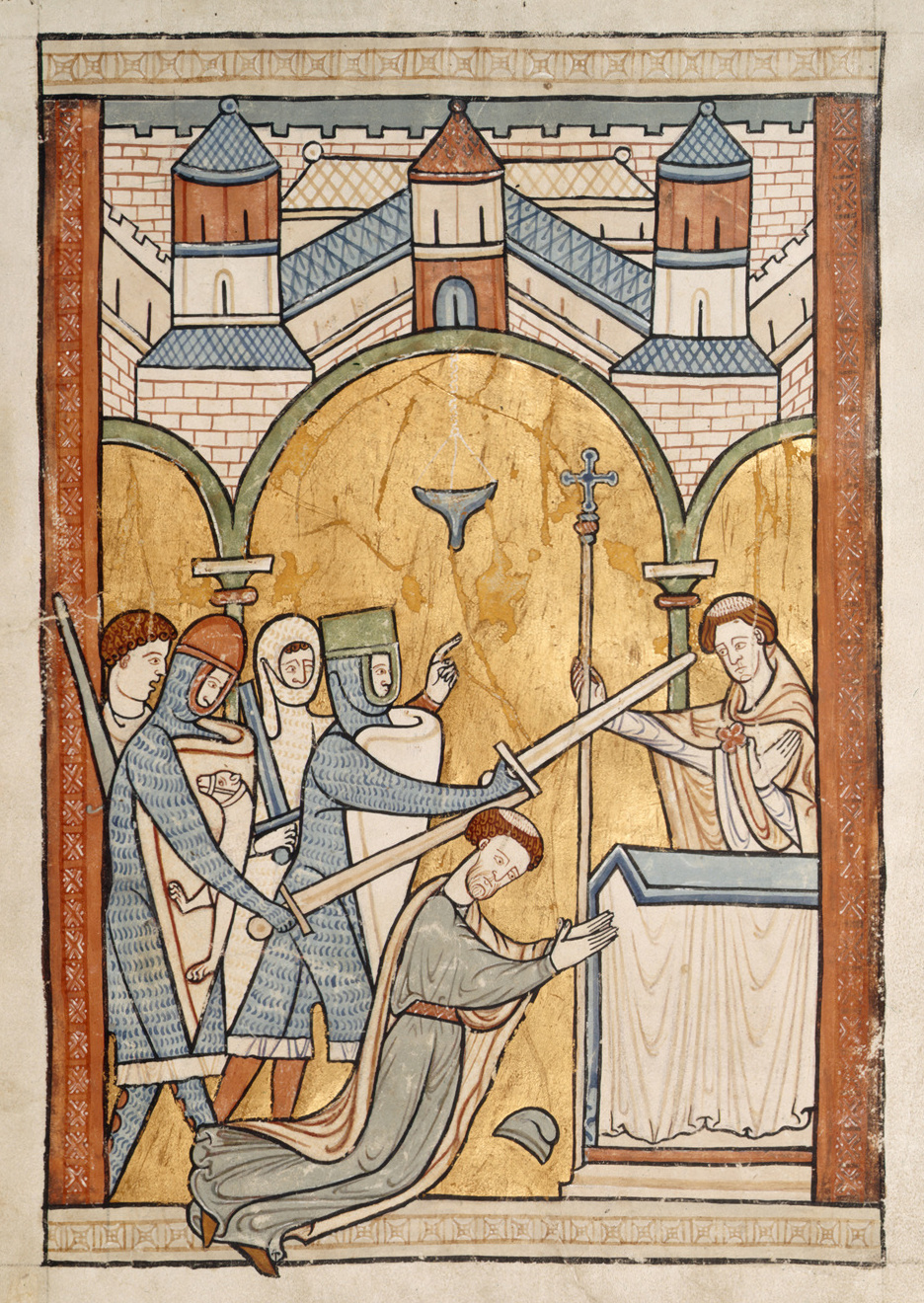
A 13th-century manuscript illumination, the earliest known depiction of Archbishop Thomas Becket's assassination in Canterbury Cathedral in 1170. British Library, London

The following steps outline the detailed labor involved to create the illuminations of one page of a manuscript:

1. Silverpoint drawing of the design is executed
2. Burnished gold dots are applied
3. Application of modulating colors
4. Continuation of previous three steps in addition to outlining marginal figures
5. Penning of a rinceau appearing in the border of page
6. Finally, marginal figures are painted

The illumination and decoration was normally planned at the inception of the work, and space reserved for it. However, the text was usually written before illumination began. In the early medieval period the text and illumination were often done by the same people, normally monks, but by the High Middle Ages the roles were typically separated, except for routine initials and flourishes, and by at least the 14th century there were secular workshops producing manuscripts, and by the beginning of the 15th century these were producing most of the best work, and were commissioned even by monasteries. When the text was complete, the illustrator set to work. Complex designs were planned out beforehand, probably on wax tablets, the sketch pad of the era. The design was then traced or drawn onto the vellum (possibly with the aid of pinpricks or other markings, as in the case of the Lindisfarne Gospels). Many incomplete manuscripts survive from most periods, giving us a good idea of working methods.

At all times, most manuscripts did not have images in them. In the early Middle Ages, manuscripts tend to either be display books with very full illumination, or manuscripts for study with at most a few decorated initials and flourishes. By the Romanesque period many more manuscripts had decorated or historiated initials, and manuscripts essentially for study often contained some images, often not in color. This trend intensified in the Gothic period, when most manuscripts had at least decorative flourishes in places, and a much larger proportion had images of some sort. Display books of the Gothic period in particular had very elaborate decorated borders of foliate patterns, often with small drolleries. A Gothic page might contain several areas and types of decoration: a miniature in a frame, a historiated initial beginning a passage of text, and a border with drolleries. Often different artists worked on the different parts of the decoration.

Another feature of illuminating manuscripts of the Middle Ages was the use of Marginalia. These additions were typically found within and around decorative borders of the text. Marginalia found within medieval manuscripts were often unique special messages and details indicative of the precision and careful consideration involved in their production. Marginalia shaped the way the text was read and influenced the reader’s interaction with it. Placement of these decorations and messages prompted the reader to scrutinize beyond the physical book to interpret the text from multiple perspectives.

Marginalia ranged from intricate decorative illustrations to those considered extremely unusual. Some examples of marginalia found within medieval manuscripts included drawings of centaurs, snail and knight combat, warrior women, battles between cats and mice, parables from biblical texts, personified foxes, rabbits, and monkeys, and hidden words and messages buried within the border decorations. The added drawings and messages of the 13th to 14th centuries were typically devoted to recurring themes and often patterned after other types of popular medieval art such as stained-glass windows, stone carvings, and wall paintings.

=== Paints ===
While the use of gold is by far one of the most captivating features of illuminated manuscripts, the bold use of varying colors provided multiple layers of dimension to the illumination. From a religious perspective, "the diverse colors wherewith the book is illustrated, not unworthily represent the multiple grace of heavenly wisdom." There is evidence of illustrators planning out color choice in advance, which indicates purposeful choice and design in the finished product. There is also a great deal of nuance when it comes to the colors and painting of manuscripts. Illuminators would be trained in color combinations and stylistic distinctions by a form of apprenticeship, so the limited number of primary literary sources discussing colors and techniques may not be accurate to what the actual illuminators learned and followed.

The medieval artist's palette was broad:

Color	Source(s)
Red	Insect-based colors, including: Carmine, also known as cochineal, where carminic acid from the Dactylopius coccus insect is mixed with an aluminum salt to produce the dye; Crimson, also known as kermes, extracted from the insect Kermes vermilio; and; Lac, a scarlet resinous secretion of a number of species of insects.; Chemical- and mineral-based colors, including: Red lead, chemically lead tetroxide, Pb_{3}O_{4}, found in nature as the mineral minium, or made by heating white lead; Vermilion, chemically mercury sulfide, HgS, and found in nature as the mineral cinnabar; Rust, chemically hydrated ferric oxide, Fe_{2}O_{3}·n H_{2}O, or iron oxide-rich earth compounds.; The color red was often associated with imagery like blood, fire, and godly power. It was the most common and inexpensive color and as such was frequently used for initials, lettering, and borders and well as general imagery.
Pink	Brazilwood pink, a plant-based pigment extracted from the Asian tree Caesalpinia sappan.; Orcein purple, a dye extracted from several species of lichen found all over the globe.; Pink was considered a fashionable color and was often found in clothing depictions of aristocrats and in filigree detail work. It also was used to color illuminated manuscript depictions of walls, lakes, and skies.
Yellow	Plant-based colors, such as: Weld, processed from the Reseda luteola plant; Turmeric, from the Curcuma longa plant; and; Saffron, rarely due to cost, from the Crocus sativus.; Mineral-based colors, including: Ochre, an earth pigment that occurs as the mineral limonite; and; Orpiment, chemically arsenic trisulfide, As_{2}S_{3}.; Yellow was often blended with other pigments in order to create natural earth tones, of which were common in medieval manuscript illumination. Yellow paint would also be layered underneath gold paint in order to create a multilayered gold effect.
Green	Verdigris, chemically cupric acetate, Cu(OAc)_{2}·(H_{2}O)_{2}, made historically by boiling copper plates in vinegar; Malachite, a mineral found in nature, chemically basic copper carbonate, Cu_{2}CO_{3}·(OH)_{2}; and; China green, a plant-based pigment extracted from buckthorn (Rhamnus tinctoria, R. utilis) berries.; Green was a relatively rare pigment on the illuminator's palette. It was used for landscapes and was often associated with visuals related to the Garden of Eden and rebirth. Verdigris Green was a specific shade almost exclusively used in cross imagery, and Green Earth was used under other pigments in order to create depth to skin tones.
Blue	Plant-based substances such as: Woad, produced from the leaves of the plant Isatis tinctoria; Indigo, derived from the plant Indigofera tinctoria; and; Turnsole, also known as folium, a dyestuff prepared from the plant Crozophora tinctoria.; Chemical- and mineral-based colors, including: Ultramarine, made from the minerals lapis lazuli or azurite; and; Smalt, now known as cobalt blue.; Blue, especially the pigment ultramarine, was a valuable and rare color and was commonly used in depictions of the Virgin Mary and for the clothing of important religious figures. Less expensive or poorer quality blue pigments were sometimes used for initials, lettering, and borders.
White	White lead, chemically basic lead carbonate, 2PbCO_{3}·Pb(OH)_{2}, and historically made by corroding sheets of lead with vinegar, and covering that with decaying matter, such as dung, to provide the necessary carbon dioxide for the chemical reaction; and; Chalk, chemically calcium carbonate, CaCO_{3}.; White was used often in association with religious objects or figures, and was also used as an underpigment as to provide a base for other colors and provide depth, notably in instances of combination with blues to create skies and with reds to create different skin tones. White was also used, especially in the Gothic period, to outline figures and to create layered highlights.
Black	Carbon, from sources such as lampblack, charcoal, or burnt bones or ivory; Sepia, from the ink produced by the cuttlefish, usually for an escape mechanism; and; Iron gall ink, where in medieval times iron nails would be boiled in vinegar; the resulting compound would then be mixed with an extract of oak apple (oak galls).; Black was used for inking text as well as for outlining facial features and gilded aspects like halos in order to create further depth and visual emphasis. Black would also be used for "sketching" the illumination before eventually filling it in with color.
Gold	Gold leaf, gold hammered extremely thin, or gold powder, bound in gum arabic or egg; the latter is called shell gold.
Silver	Silver, either silver leaf or powdered, as with gold; and; Tin leaf, also as with gold.; Silver would be used for lettering in a similar fashion to gold, to provide shine and beauty to the page.

=== Gilding ===
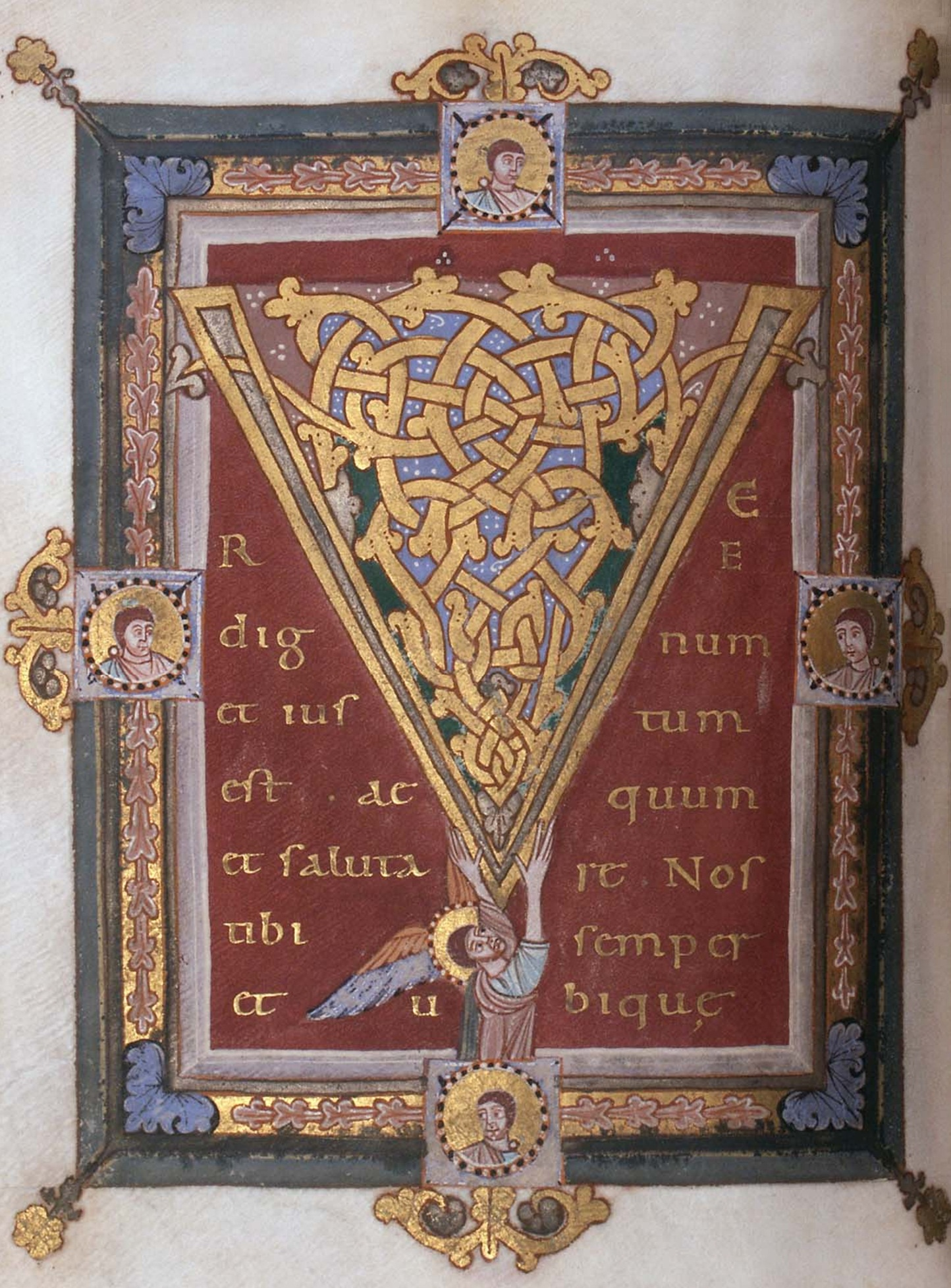
The 11th-century Tyniec Sacramentary was written with gold on a purple background. National Library of Poland, Warsaw.

On the strictest definition, a manuscript is not considered "illuminated" unless one or many illuminations contained metal, normally gold leaf or shell gold paint, or at least was brushed with gold specks. Gold leaf was from the 12th century usually polished, a process known as burnishing. The inclusion of gold alludes to many different possibilities for the text. If the text is of religious nature, lettering in gold is a sign of exalting the text. In the early centuries of Christianity, Gospel manuscripts were sometimes written entirely in gold. The gold ground style, with all or most of the background in gold, was taken from Byzantine mosaics and icons. Aside from adding rich decoration to the text, scribes during the time considered themselves to be praising God with their use of gold. Furthermore, gold was used if a patron who had commissioned a book to be written wished to display the vastness of their riches. Eventually, the addition of gold to manuscripts became so frequent "that its value as a barometer of status with the manuscript was degraded". During this time period the price of gold had become so cheap that its inclusion in an illuminated manuscript accounted for only a tenth of the cost of production. By adding richness and depth to the manuscript, the use of gold in illuminations created pieces of art that are still valued today.

The application of gold leaf or dust to an illumination is a very detailed process that only the most skilled illuminators can undertake and successfully achieve. The first detail an illuminator considered when dealing with gold was whether to use gold leaf or specks of gold that could be applied with a brush. When working with gold leaf, the pieces would be hammered and thinned. The use of this type of leaf allowed for numerous areas of the text to be outlined in gold. There were several ways of applying gold to an illumination. One of the most popular included mixing the gold with stag's glue and then "pour it into water and dissolve it with your finger." Once the gold was soft and malleable in the water, it was ready to be applied to the page. Illuminators had to be very careful when applying gold leaf to the manuscript because gold leaf is able to "adhere to any pigment which had already been laid, ruining the design, and secondly the action of burnishing it is vigorous and runs the risk of smudging any painting already around it."

== Patrons ==
At least in earlier periods, monasteries were the biggest manufacturers of illuminated manuscripts. They produced manuscripts for their own use; heavily illuminated ones tended to be reserved for liturgical use in the early period, while the monastery library held plainer texts. In the early period manuscripts were often commissioned by rulers for their own personal use or as diplomatic gifts, and many old manuscripts continued to be given in this way, even into the Early Modern period. Especially after the book of hours became popular, wealthy individuals commissioned works as a sign of status within the community, sometimes including donor portraits or heraldry: "In a scene from the New Testament, Christ would be shown larger than an apostle, who would be bigger than a mere bystander in the picture, while the humble donor of the painting or the artist himself might appear as a tiny figure in the corner." The calendar was also personalized, recording the feast days of local or family saints.

By the end of the Middle Ages even many religious manuscripts were produced in secular commercial workshops, such as that of William de Brailes in 13th-century Oxford, for distribution through a network of agents, and blank spaces might be reserved for the appropriate heraldry to be added locally by the buyer. The growing genre of luxury illuminated manuscripts of secular works was very largely produced in commercial workshops, mostly in cities such as Paris, Ghent, Bruges and north Italy.

== Gallery ==
=== Byzantine, Eastern European, Caucasus, Syriac ===
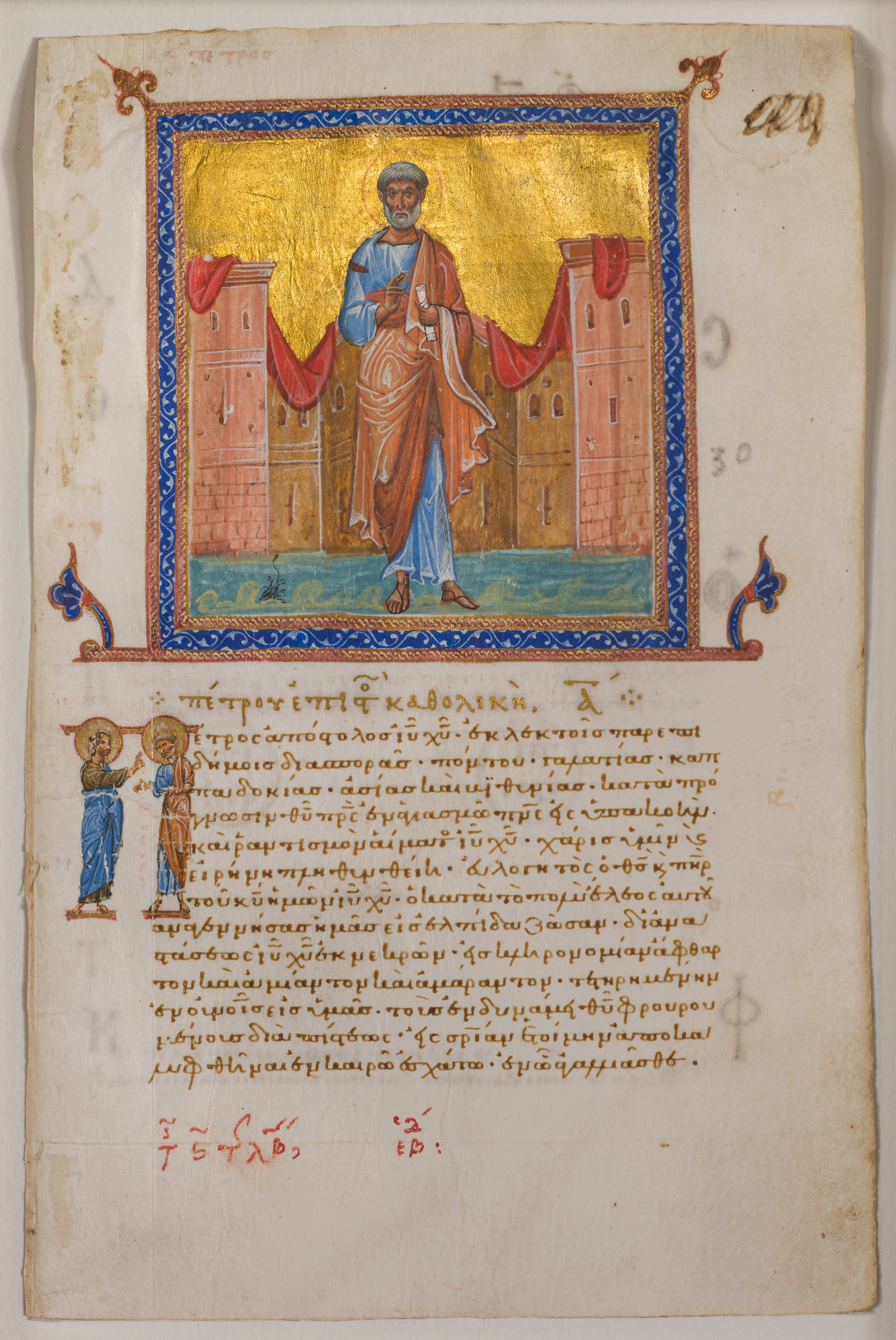
Leaf from a Byzantine Psalter and New Testament; 1079; ink, tempera and gold on vellum; sheet: 163 × 109 mm; Cleveland Museum of Art (Cleveland, Ohio, US)

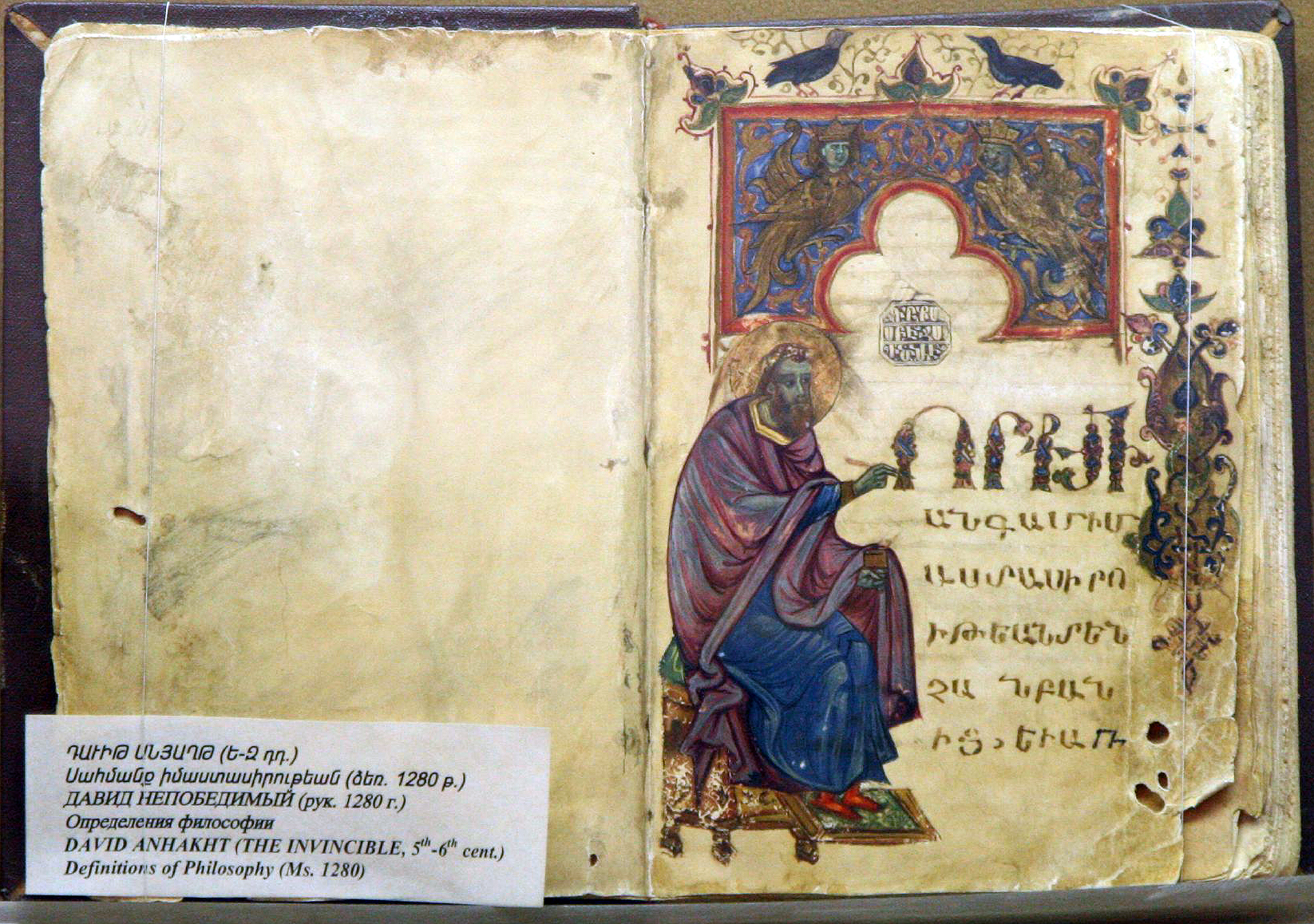
Definitions of Philosophy of David the Invincible; 1280; vellum; Matenadaran (Yerevan, Armenia)

=== Ethiopian & Coptic ===
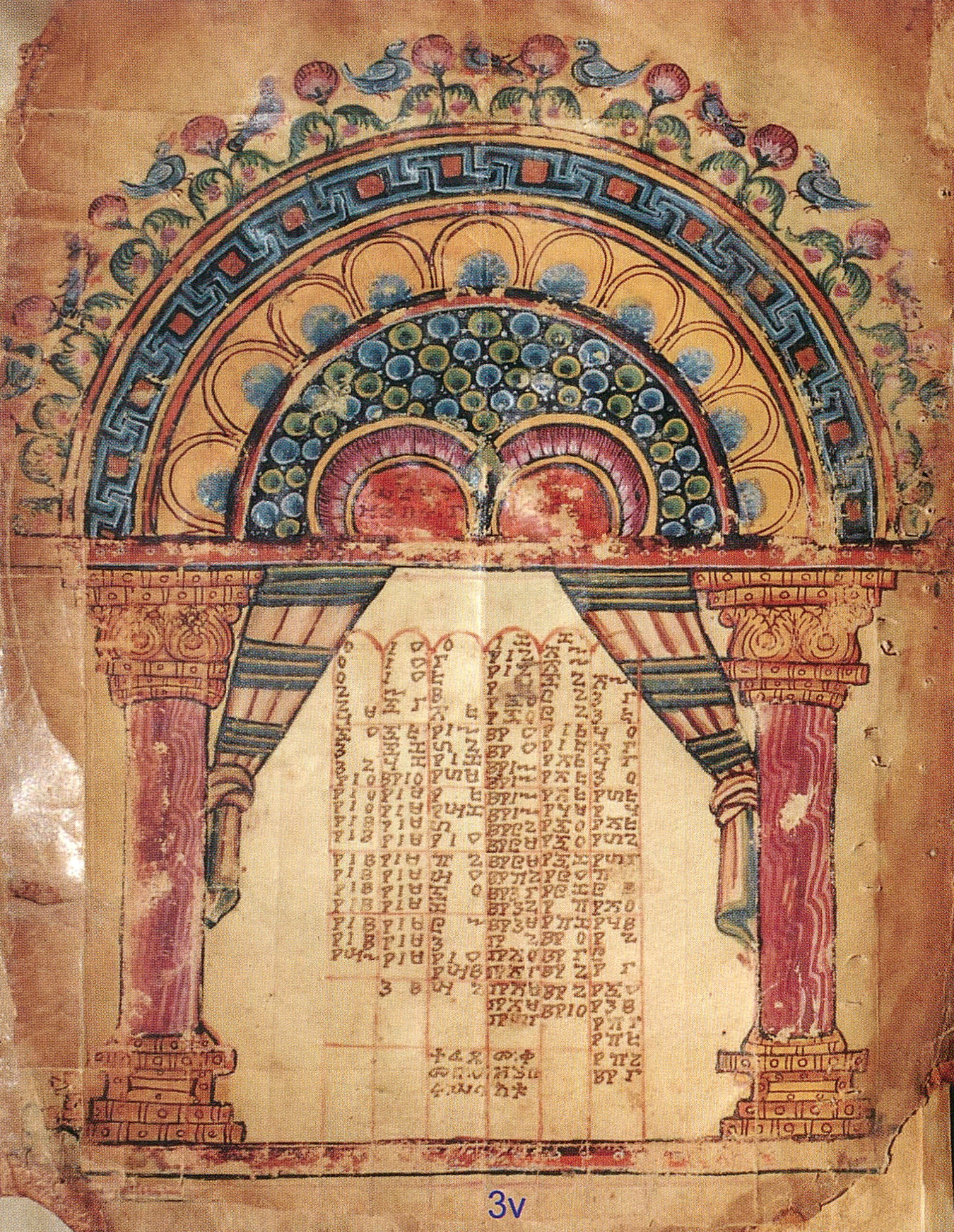
Eusebian canons from the Garima Gospels 1 (ca 530 -660)

Incipit page (ca 1504)

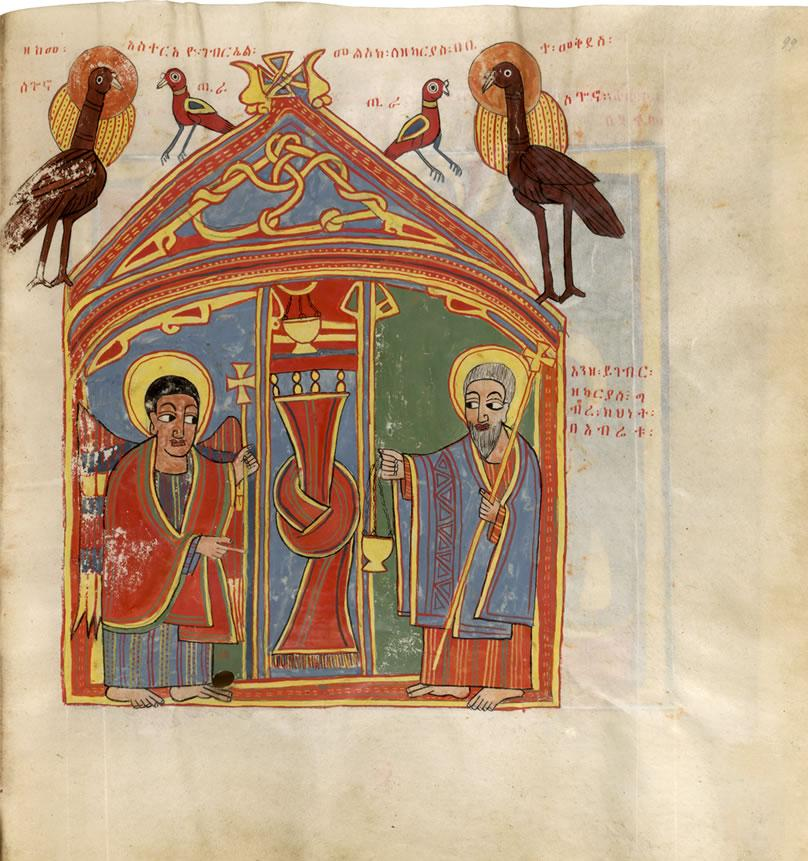
Annunciation to Zechariah (ca 1700)

=== Medieval Western European ===
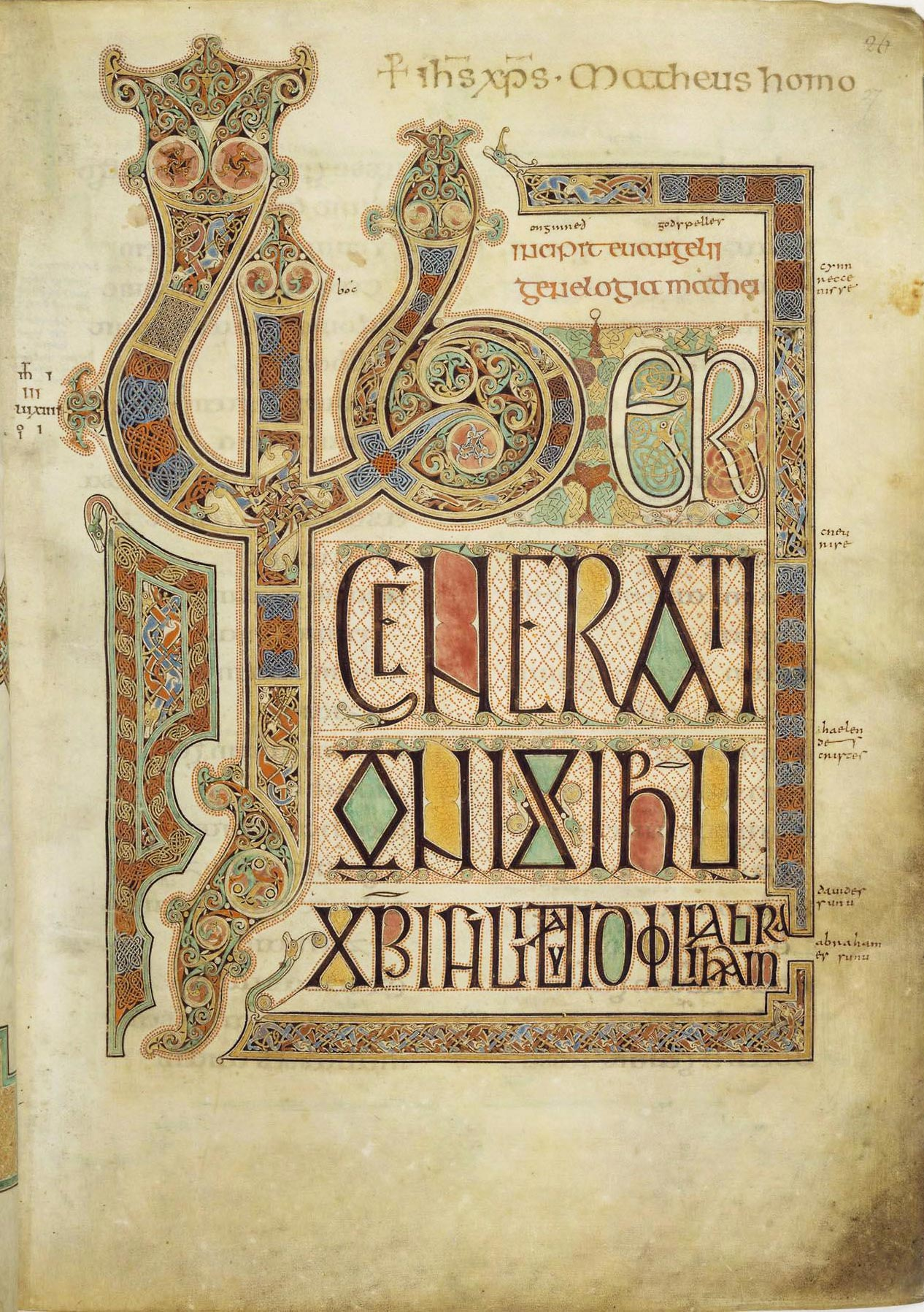
Lindisfarne Gospels (715-20, Hiberno-Saxon)

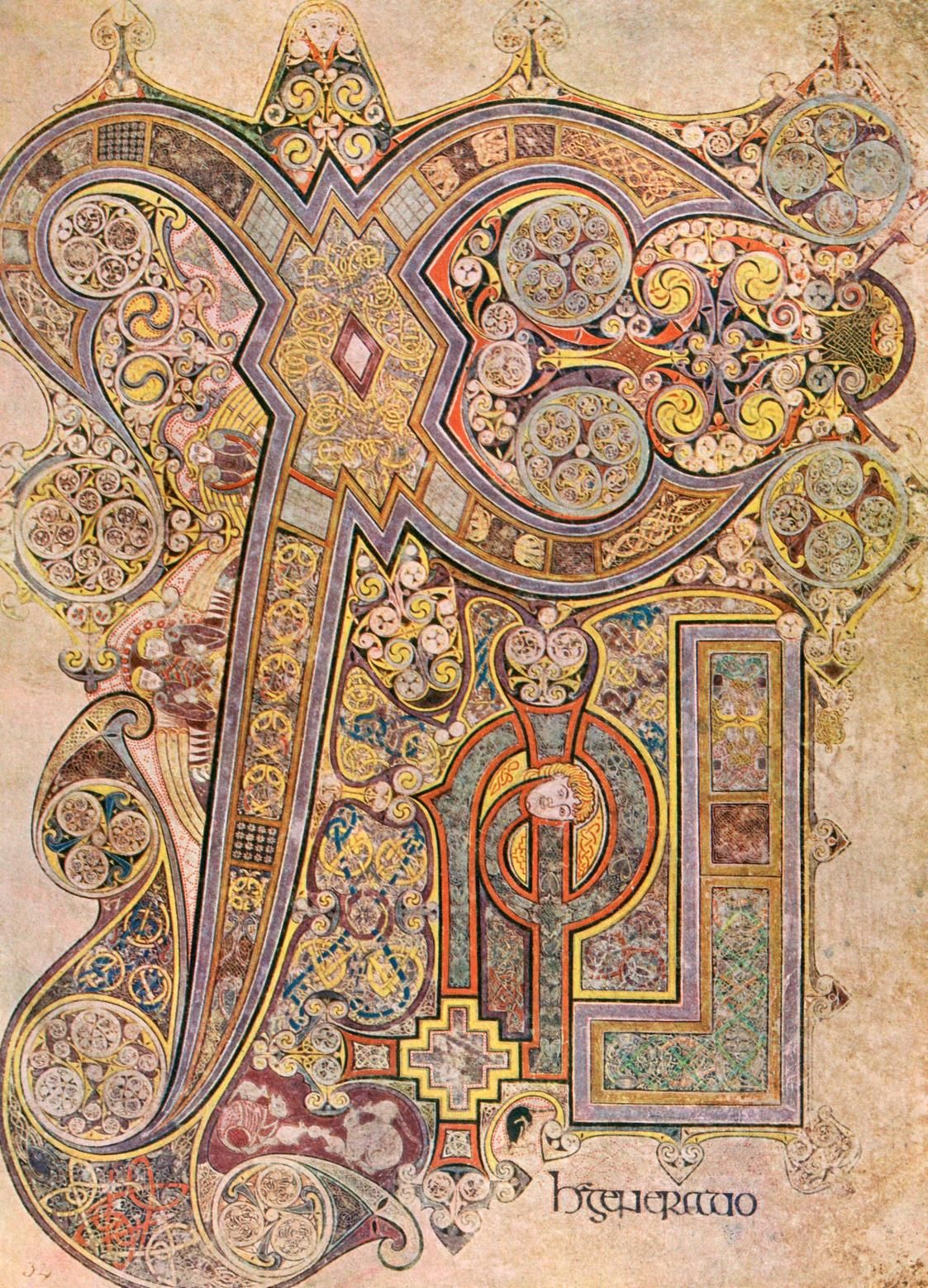
Book of Kells folio 34r, ca 800 (Ireland or Scotland)

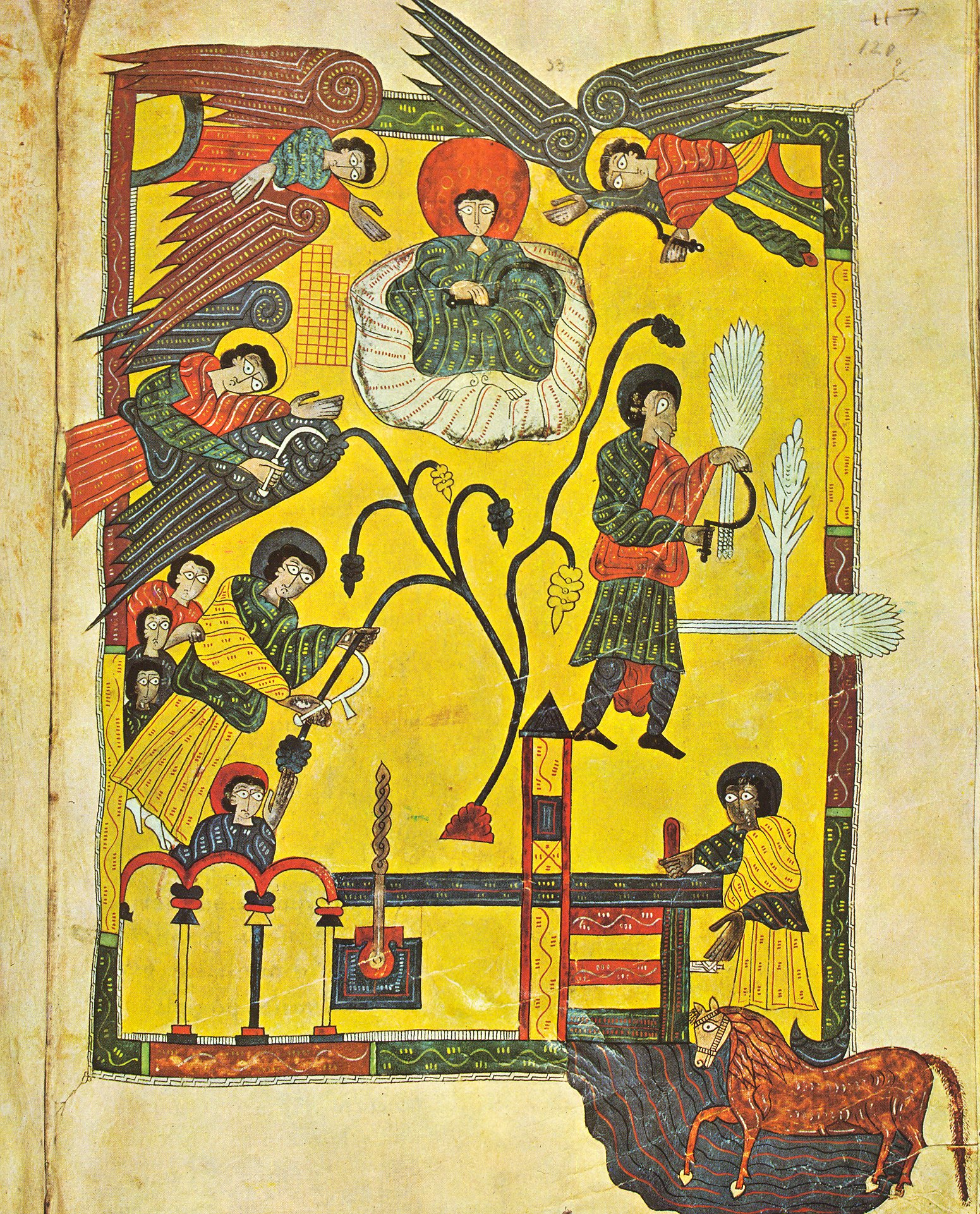
Beatus of the Escorial, , Apocalypse XIV, circa 950 (Spain)

=== Late Medieval ===
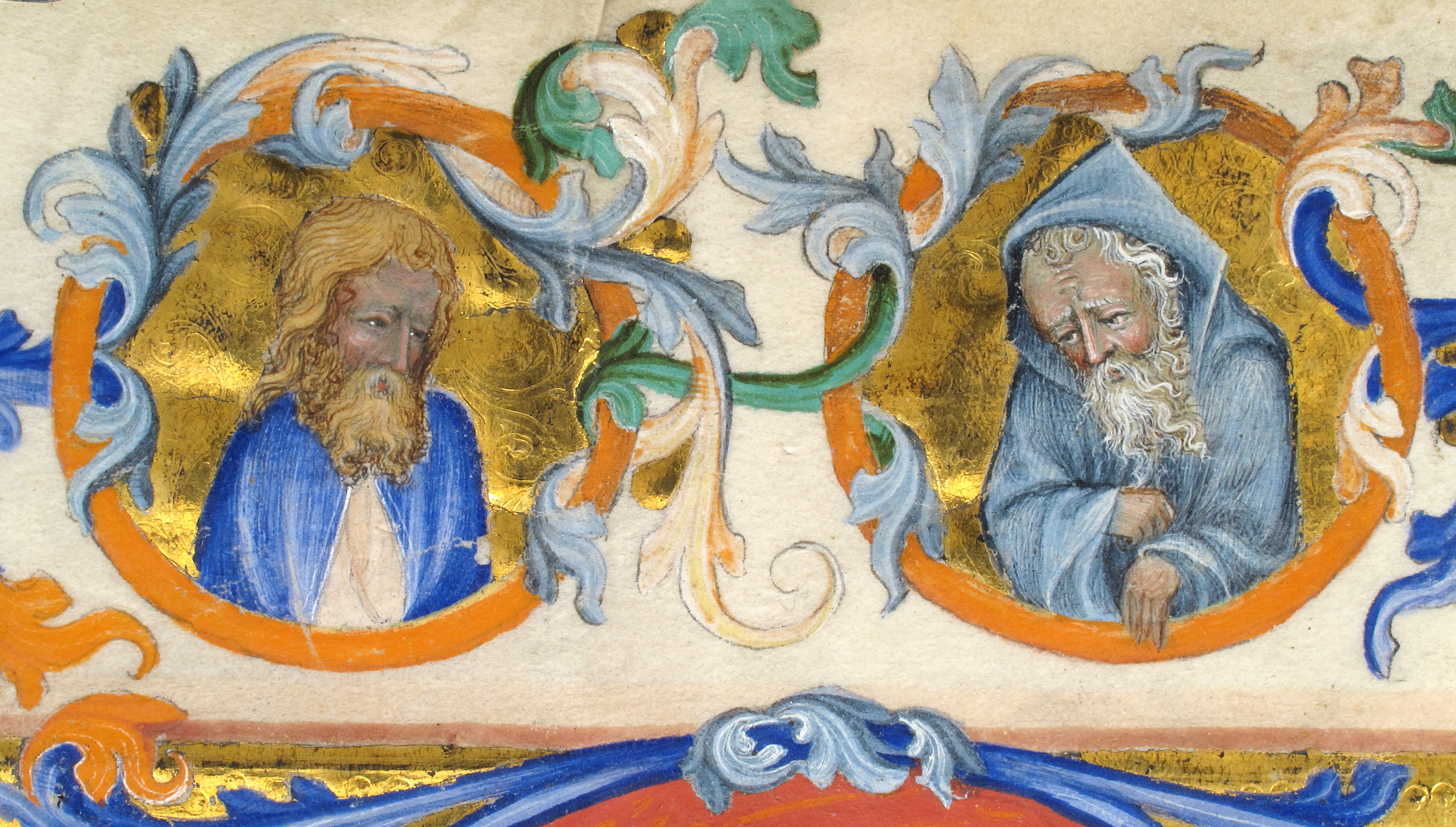
Detail from Bifolium with Christ in Majesty in an Initial A, from an Antiphonary; c. 1405; tempera, gold, and ink on parchment; Metropolitan Museum of Art (New York City)

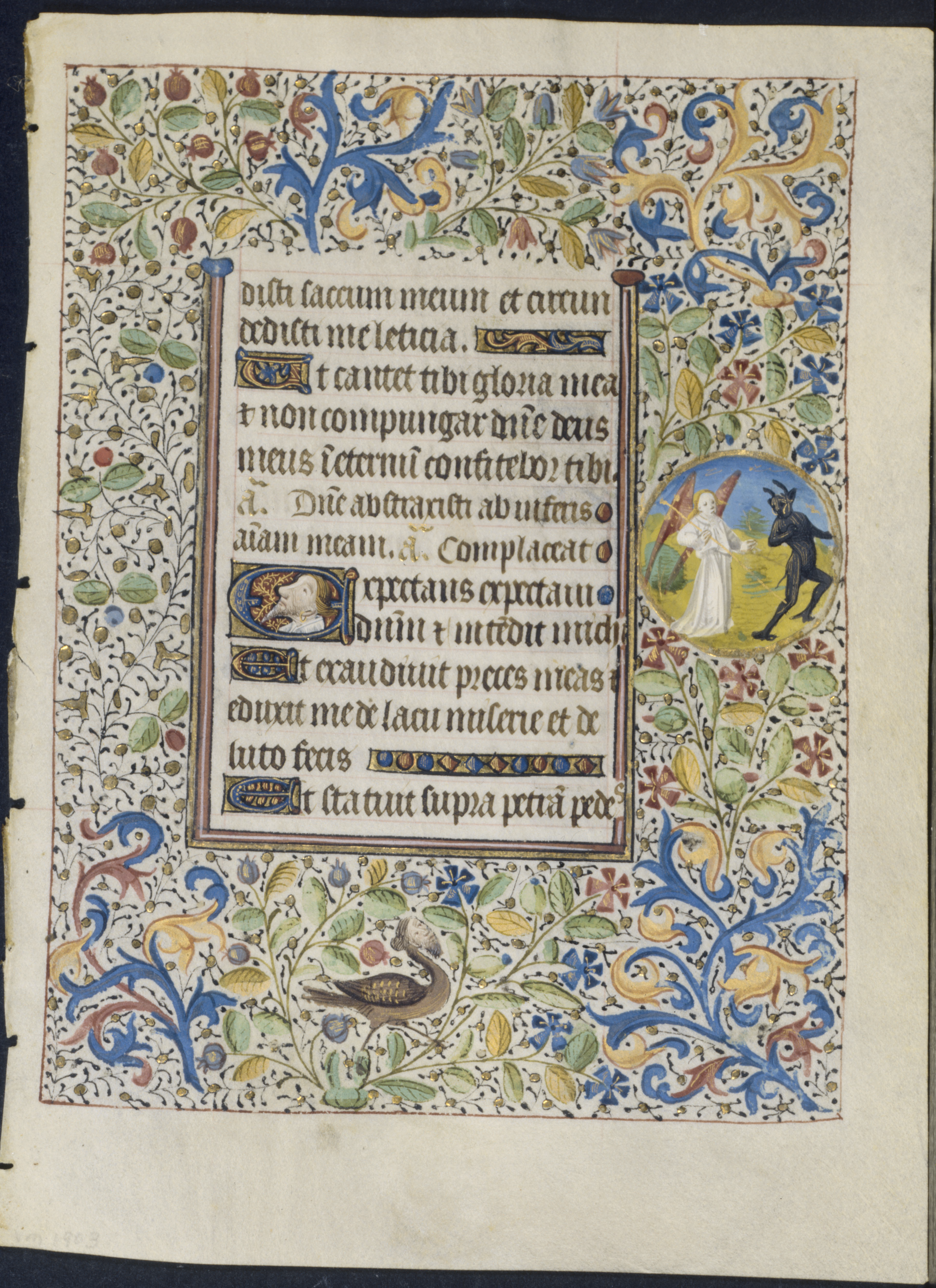
Leaf from a Book of Hours; c. 1460; ink, tempera and gold on vellum; leaf: 197 × 143 mm; Cleveland Museum of Art

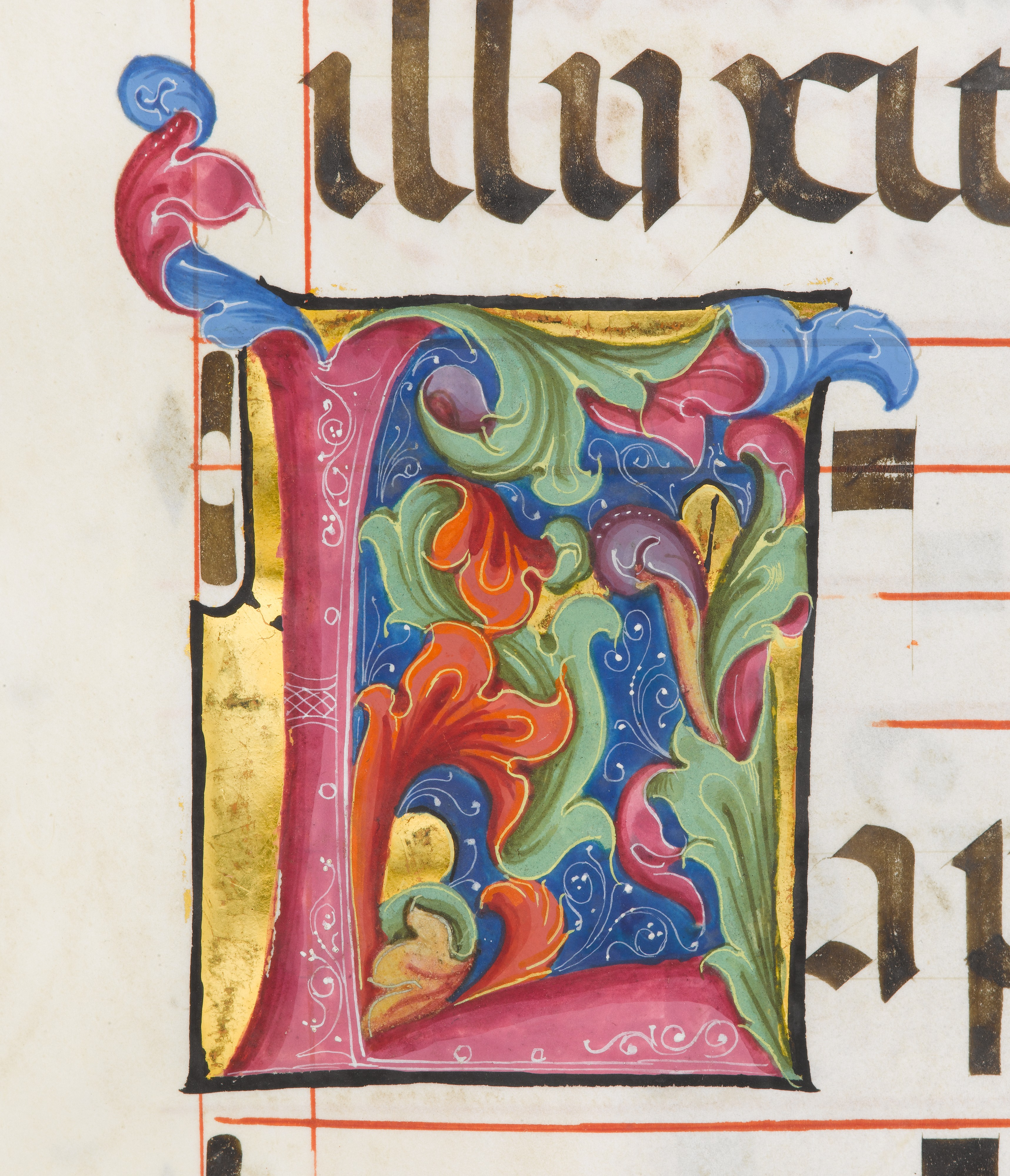
Detail of a L from Benedictine Antiphonary; by Belbello da Pavia; c. 1467–1470; tempera, gold, and ink on parchment, binding: leather over wood boards with copper alloy corner mounts and bosses; Metropolitan Museum of Art

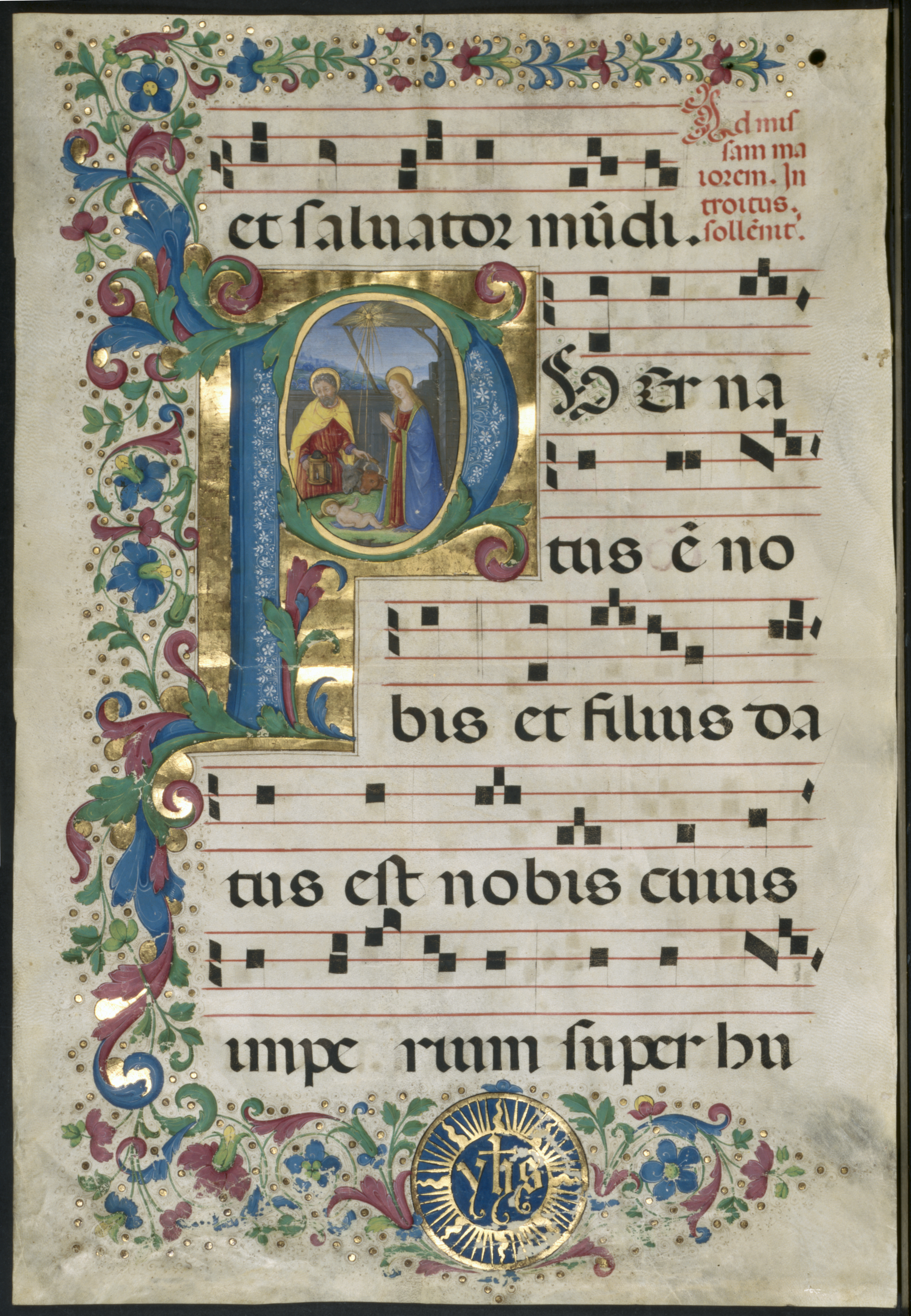
Leaf from a Gradual: Initial P with the Nativity; 1495; ink, tempera and gold on vellum; each leaf: 598 × 41 mm; Cleveland Museum of Art

=== Renaissance ===
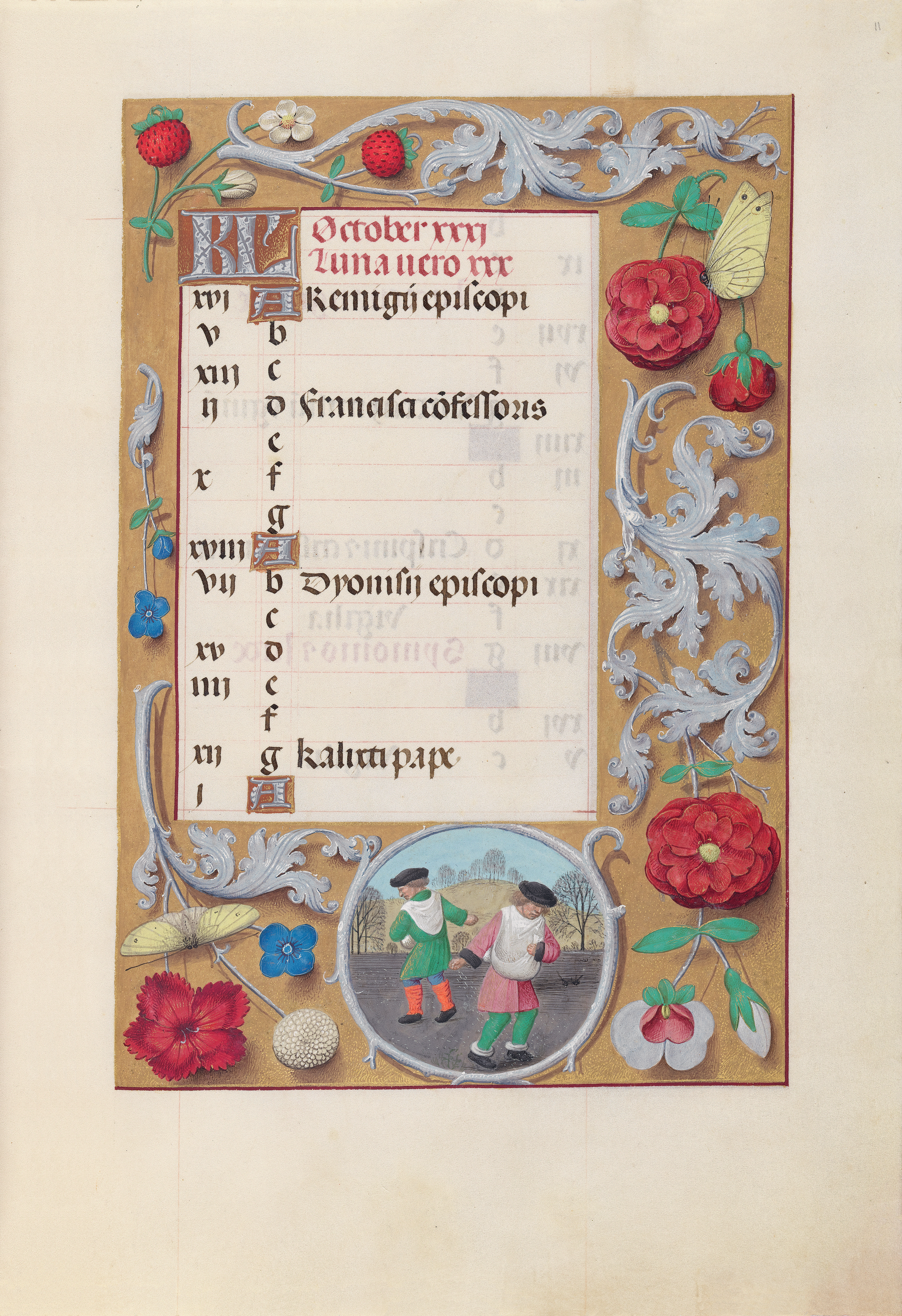
Hours of Queen Isabella the Catholic, Queen of Spain; c. 1500; ink, tempera, and gold on vellum; codex: 225 × 152 mm; Cleveland Museum of Art

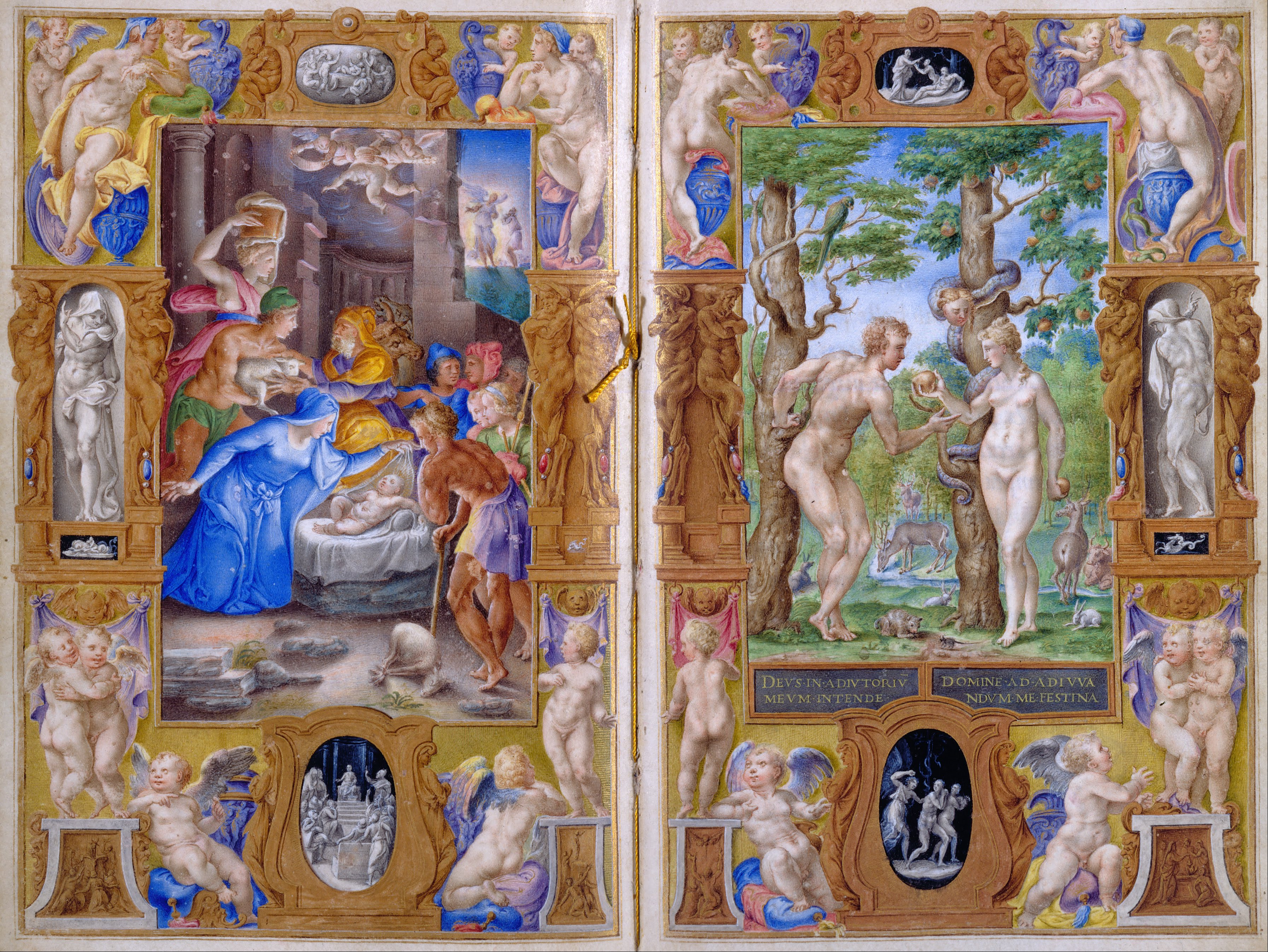
Farnese Hours, an example of a Renaissance illuminated page; by Giulio Clovio; 1537–1546; illumination on parchment; 171 × 111 mm; Morgan Library & Museum (New York City)

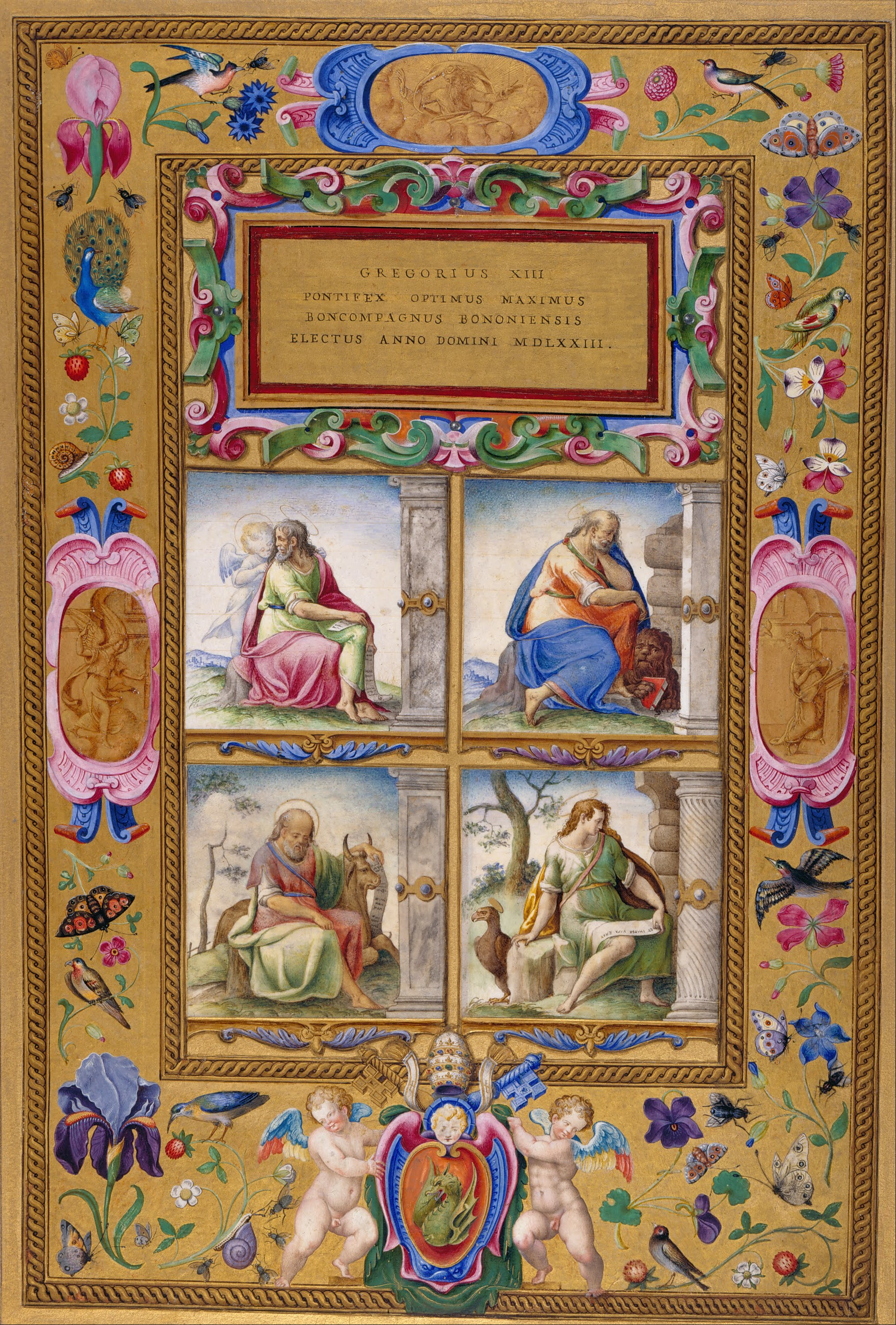
Four Evangelists; 1572–1585; 413 × 277 mm; from Italy, probably Rome; Morgan Library & Museum

=== Islamicate and South Asian ===
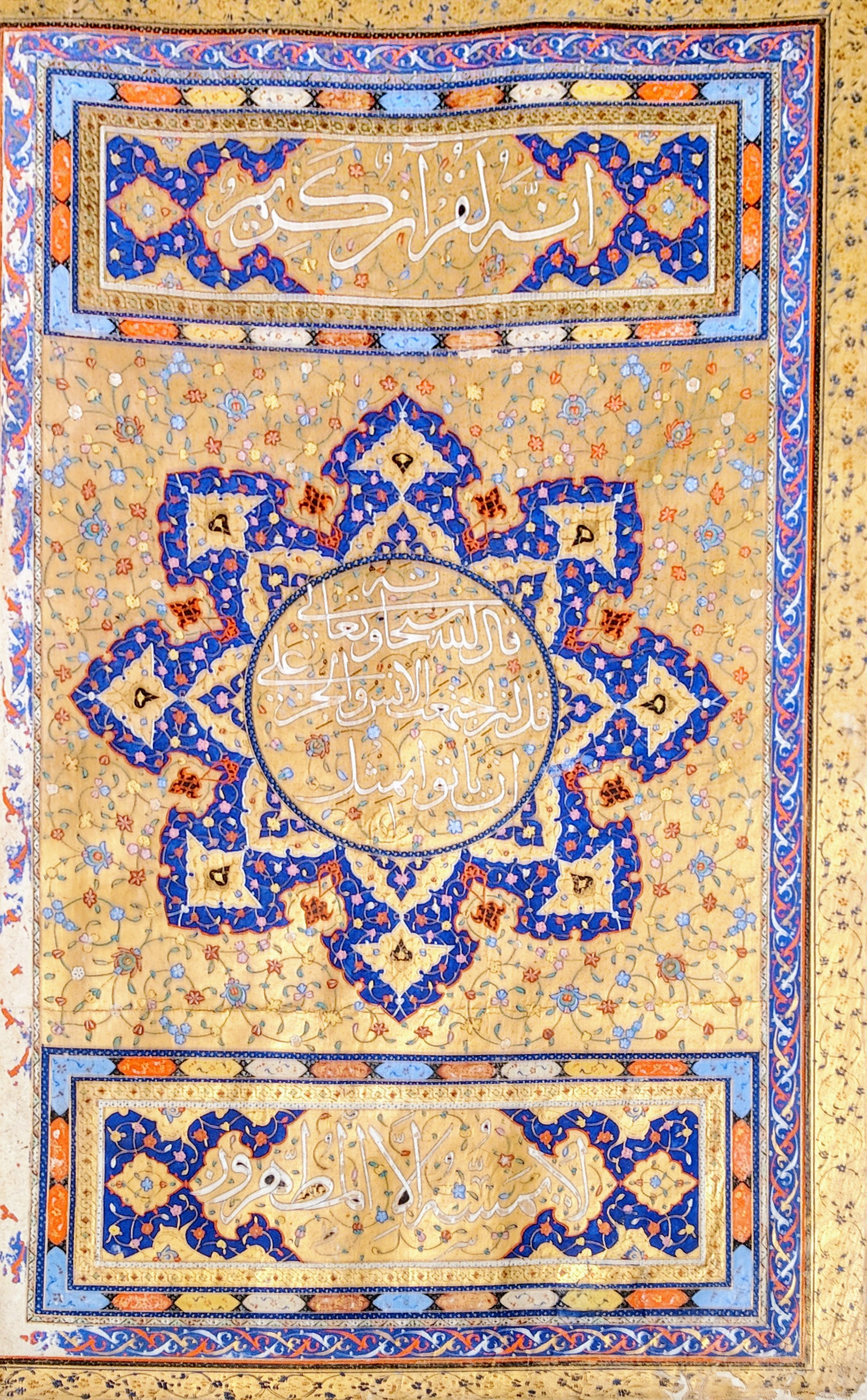
Al-Quran, 1591–92, from Safavid Iran; Turkish and Islamic Arts Museum (Istanbul)

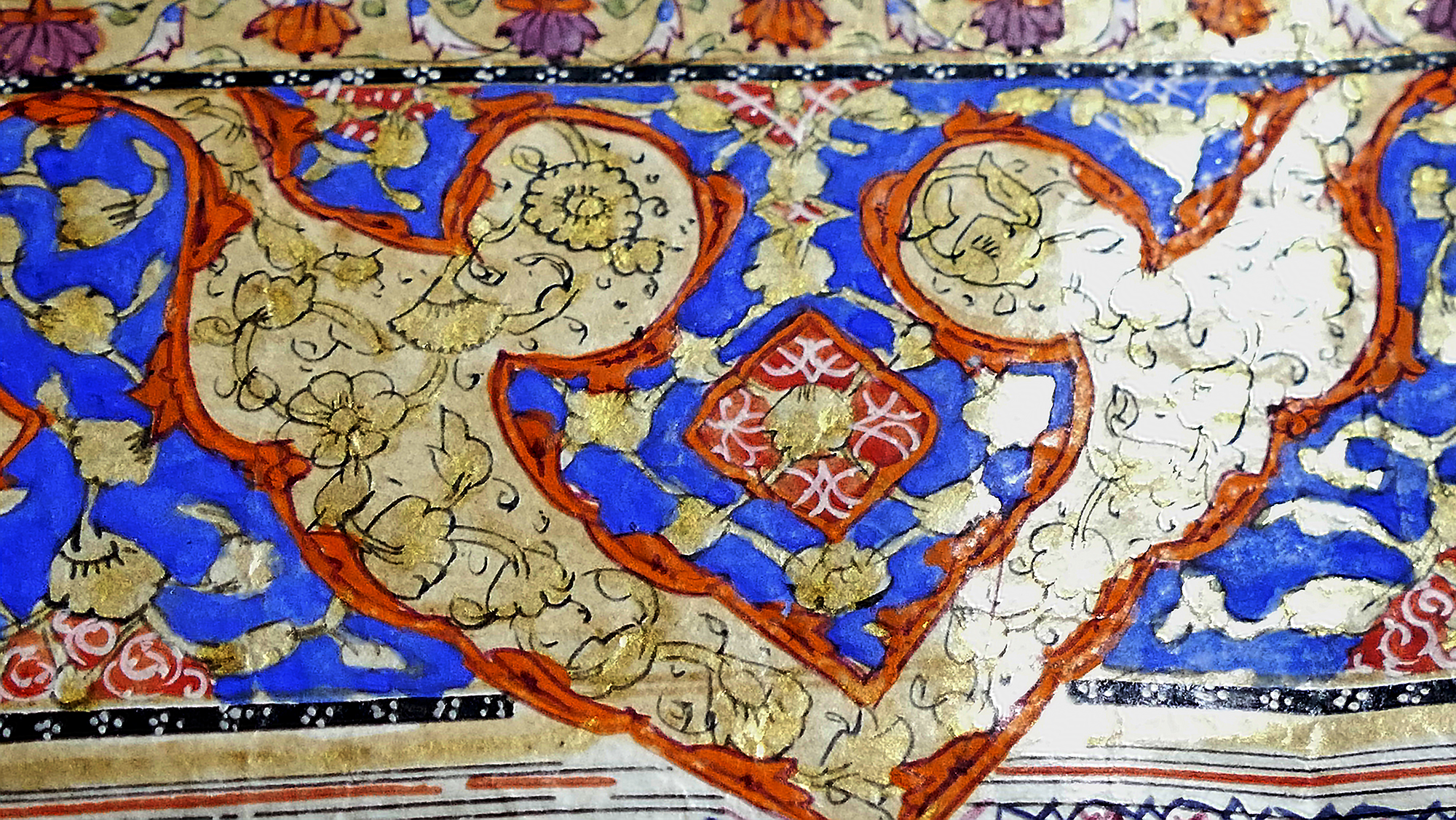
Example of an elaborately decorated border of a Sikh illuminated manuscript from a 17th-century Guru Granth Sahib manuscript kept at Gurdwara Mattan Sahib in Martand, Kashmir, India. It is known as the Sunehri bir (golden corpus)

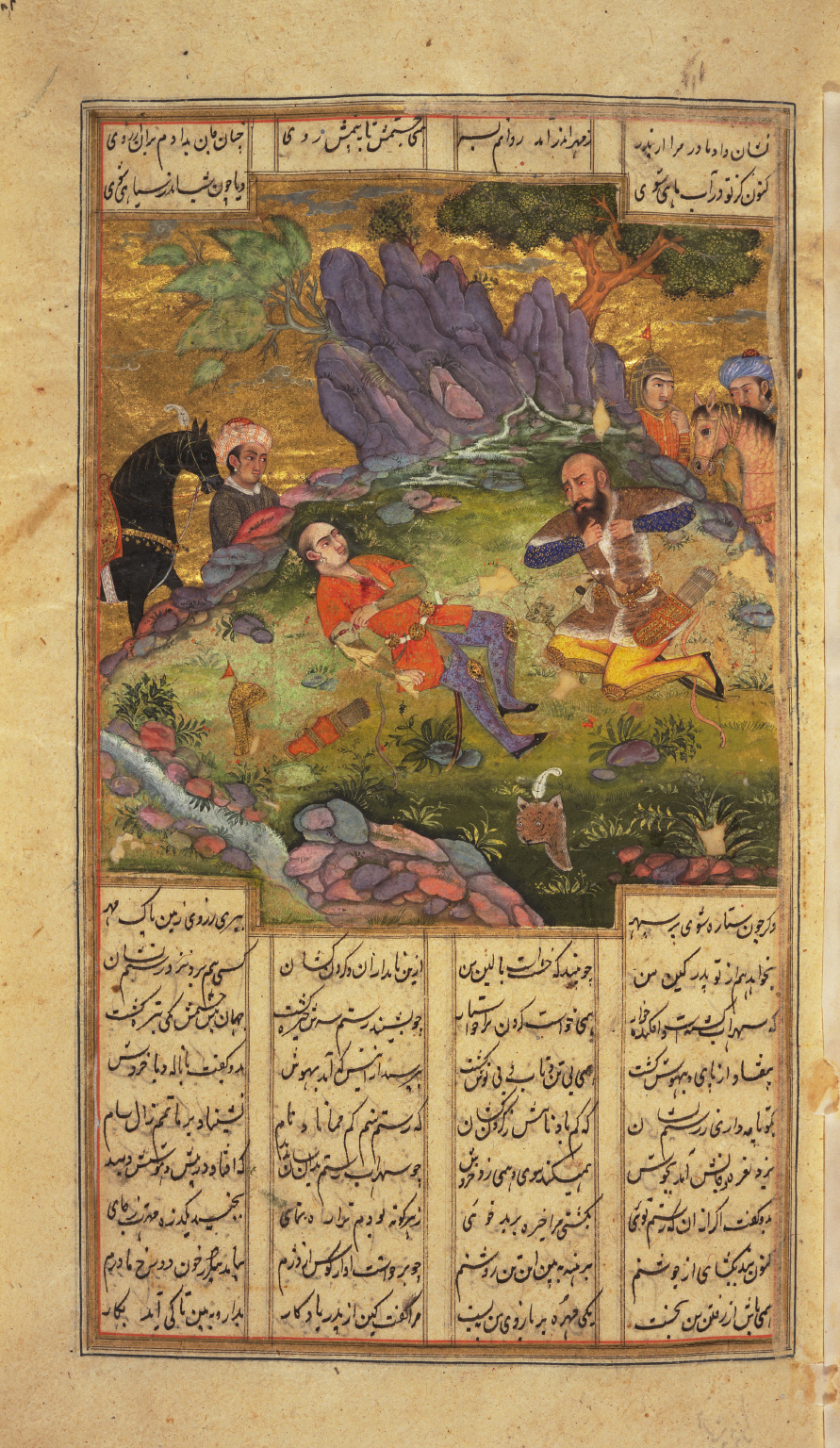
The great Iranian hero Rostam mourns his son Sohrab, whom he has unwittingly slain in single combat. Folio of a manuscript of 1655 of Ferdowsi's Iranian epic Shahnameh, held in Princeton University Library Unknown artist.

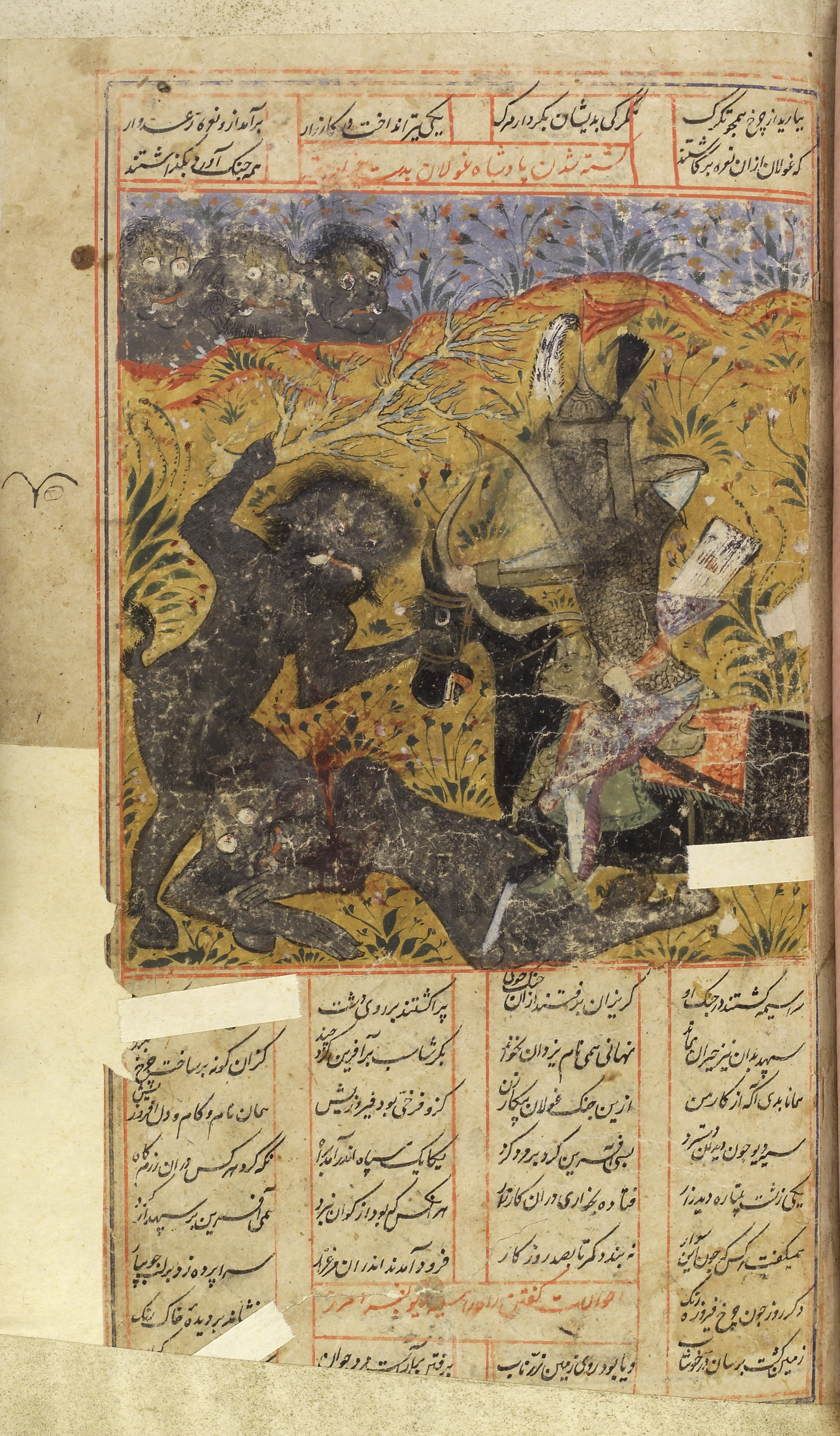
Jinn, recognisable by their characteristic bestial appearance, gather to do battle with Faramarz, son of Rostam. Leaf from another manuscript of Ferdowsi's Shahnameh (The Book of Kings)

=== East Asian ===
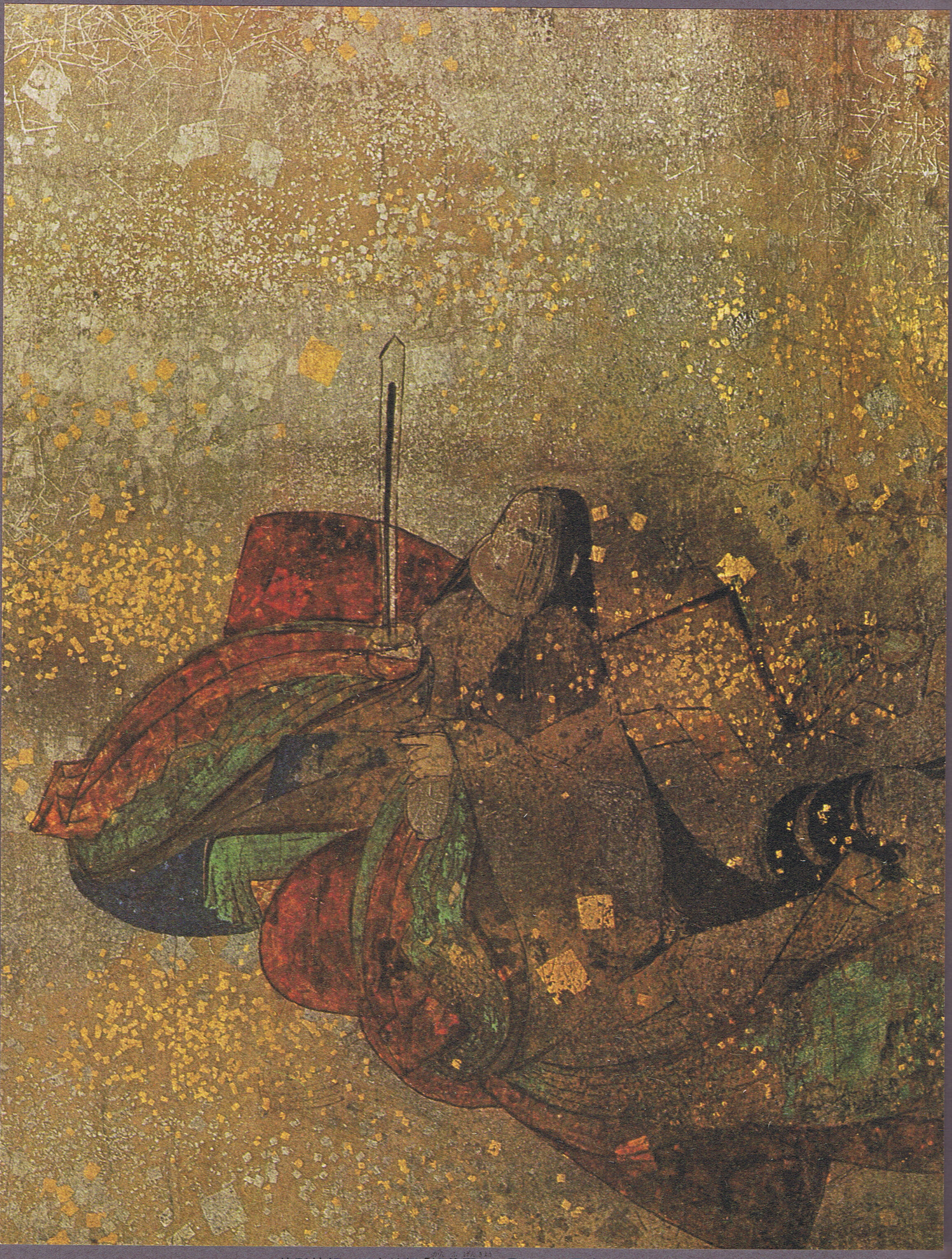
Heike Noukyou, 1164–1167, from Itsukushima, Japan; Itsukushima Jinja

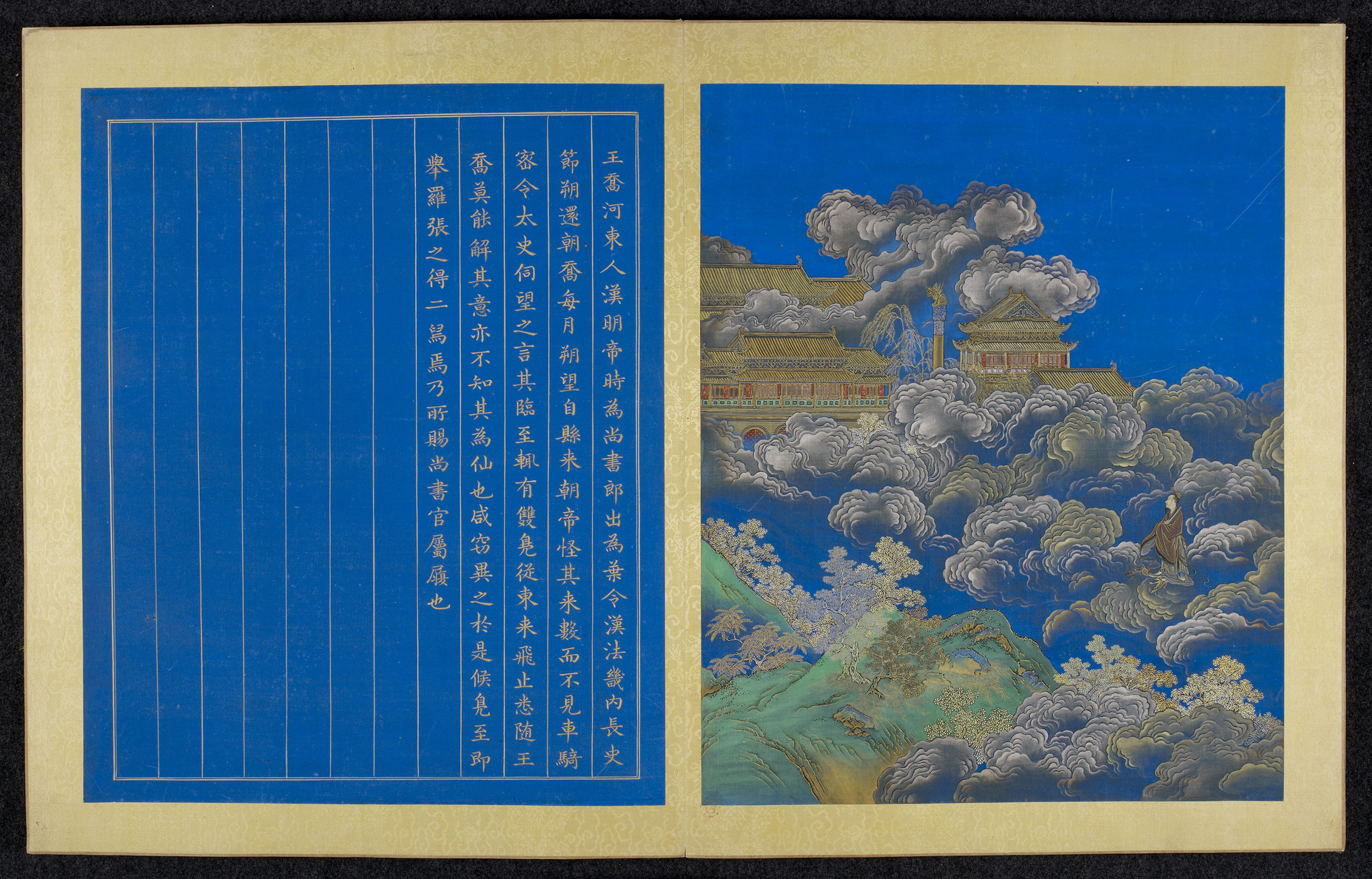
A Keepsake from the Cloud Gallery (Yuntai Xianrui), 18th century. British Library

== See also ==
- List of illuminated manuscripts
- Gothic book illustration
- Renaissance illumination
- Tempera

== Sources ==
- Alexander, Jonathan A.G., Medieval Illuminators and their Methods of Work, 1992, Yale UP, ISBN 0300056893
- Coleman, Joyce, Mark Cruse, and Kathryn A. Smith, eds. The Social Life of Illumination: Manuscripts, Images, and Communities in the Late Middle Ages (Series: Medieval Texts and Cultures in Northern Europe, vol. 21. Turnhout: Brepols Publishing, 2013). xxiv + 552 pp online review
- Calkins, Robert G. Illuminated Books of the Middle Ages. 1983, Cornell University Press, ISBN 0500233756
- Camille, M. (1992). Image on the edge: the margins of medieval art. Harvard University Press.
- Contadini, Anna (1 January 2012). A World of Beasts: A Thirteenth-Century Illustrated Arabic Book on Animals (the Kitāb Na't al-Ḥayawān) in the Ibn Bakhtīshū' Tradition. Brill. doi:10.1163/9789004222656_005.
- De Hamel, Christopher. A History of Illuminated Manuscript (Phaidon, 1986)
- Hillenbrand, Robert (1 January 2010). "The Schefer Ḥarīrī: A Study in Islamic Frontispiece Design". Arab Painting: 117–134. doi:10.1163/9789004236615_011. ISBN 978-90-04-23661-5.
- Kren, T. & McKendrick, Scot (eds), Illuminating the Renaissance – The Triumph of Flemish Manuscript Painting in Europe, Getty Museum/Royal Academy of Arts, 2003, ISBN 1-903973-28-7
- Liepe, Lena. Studies in Icelandic Fourteenth Century Book Painting, Reykholt: Snorrastofa, rit. vol. VI, 2009.
- Melo, M.J., Castro, R., Nabais, P. et al. The book on how to make all the colour paints for illuminating books: unravelling a Portuguese Hebrew illuminators' manual' ' Herit Sci 6, 44 (2018). https://doi.org/10.1186/s40494-018-0208-z
- Morgan, Nigel J., Stella Panayotova, and Martine Meuwese. Illuminated Manuscripts in Cambridge: A Catalogue of Western Book Illumination in the Fitzwilliam Museum and the Cambridge Colleges (London : Harvey Miller Publishers in conjunction with the Modern Humanities Association. 1999– )
- Pächt, Otto, Book Illumination in the Middle Ages (trans fr German), 1986, Harvey Miller Publishers, London, ISBN 0199210608
- Rudy, Kathryn M. (2016), Piety in Pieces: How Medieval Readers Customized their Manuscripts, Open Book Publishers, doi:10.11647/OBP.0094, hdl:10023/9562, ISBN 9781783742356
- Snelders, B. (2010). Identity and Christian-Muslim interaction : medieval art of the Syrian Orthodox from the Mosul area. Peeters, Leuven.
- Wieck, Roger. "Folia Fugitiva: The Pursuit of the Illuminated Manuscript Leaf". The Journal of the Walters Art Gallery, Vol. 54, 1996.
