= Samson Ha-Nakdan =

German-Jewish writer and Hebrew grammarian

Personal life
- Born: Samson Ha-Nakdan Xanten, Germany
- Died: Germany
- Children: Kolonymus Ha-Nakdan

Religious life
- Religion: Judaism
- Main work: Mafte'aḥ ha-Dikduk Ḥibbur ha-Konim

Samson Ha-Nakdan (Hebrew: שמשון הנקדן; fl.1240) was a 13th-century German-Jewish writer and Hebrew grammarian.

== Biography ==
Possibly born in Xanten, Germany, he studied Hebrew grammar in Germany, where he became aquatinted with the works of Jonah ibn Janah and Abraham ibn Ezra, and Elias Levita often references Rabbi Samson's works. Later in his life he adopted the surname "Ha-Nakdan" ("the grammarian"), which his descendants also adopted, such as his grandson Joseph ben Kalonymus ha-Nakdan who was also a Hebrew grammarian.

== Works ==
- Mafte'aḥ ha-Dikduk - a work on the pronunciation and accents of medieval hebrew. Some have identified it to be identical with Sefer Kelalei ha-Dikduk.
- Ḥibbur ha-Konim (also called Sefer ha-Shimshoni) - a work on the which vowel-points and accents of medieval Hebrew.
