= Joseph ben Kalonymus ha-Nakdan =

Joseph ben Kalonymus ha-Nakdan (Hebrew: יוסף בן קלונימוס הנקדן; fl. early 13th century) was a German grammarian, Masorite, and poet. He was the grandson of grammarian Samson Ha-Nakdan.

He was the author of a long acrostic poem on the accents, with a commentary. Joseph also composed several piyyutim. Among his known works are:

- אדיר במרום ('Mighty in the Heights') and מלך אליון ('Exalted Kings'), both preserved in a French maḥzor dated to 1278;
- A kinah beginning with אמרר בבכי; and
- A seliḥah beginning with אזעק חמס קורות, in memory of the martyrs of the 1235 blood libel massacre in Fulda.
