= List of Jewish illuminated manuscripts =

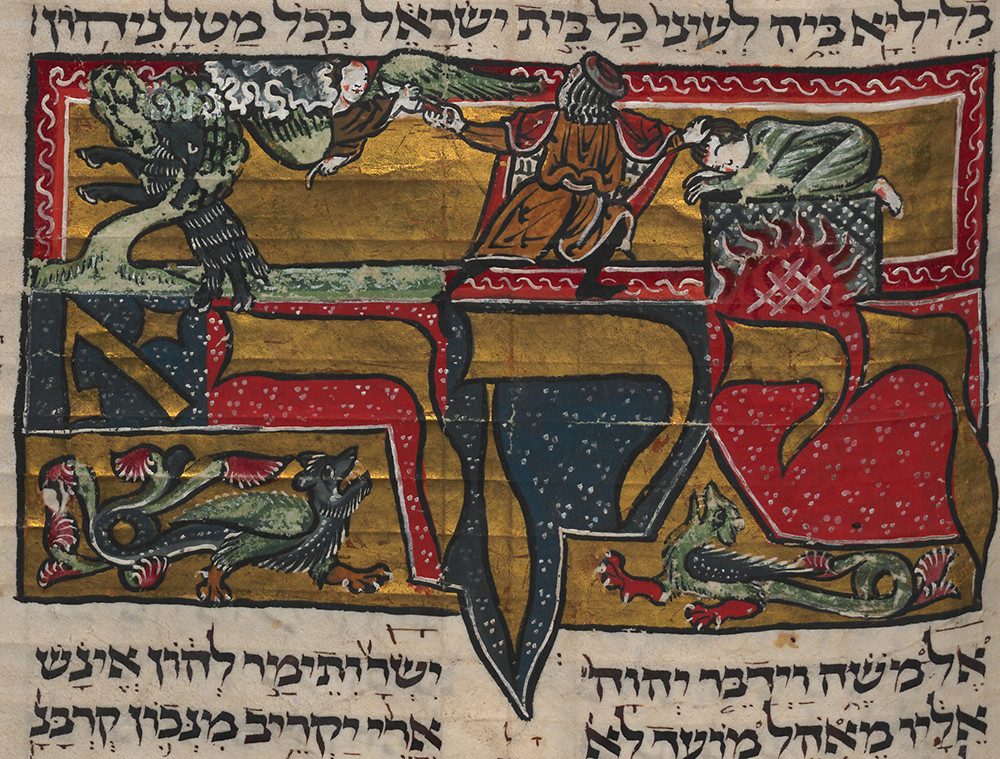
Sacrifice of Isaac, opening of Leviticus, detail of fol. 102r, Ambrosian Tanakh, made in Germany, ca. 1236–38, Biblioteca Ambrosiana

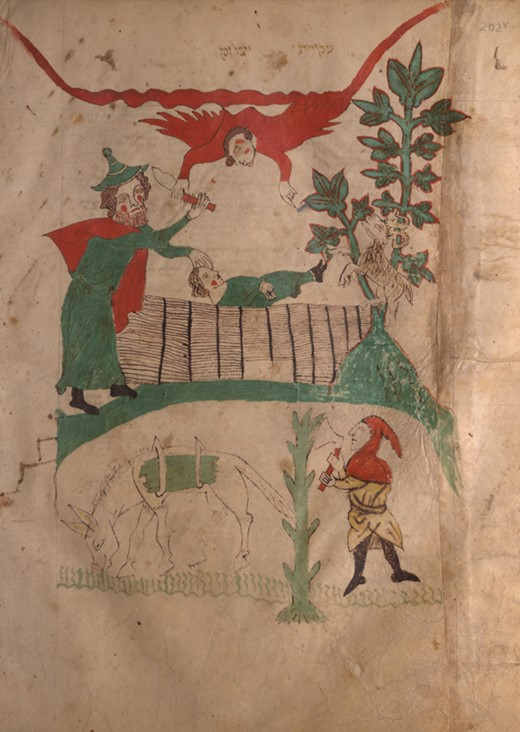
Sacrifice of Isaac, The Hammelburg Mahzor, 1347–48, Hammelburg, Germany. University and State Library Darmstadt.

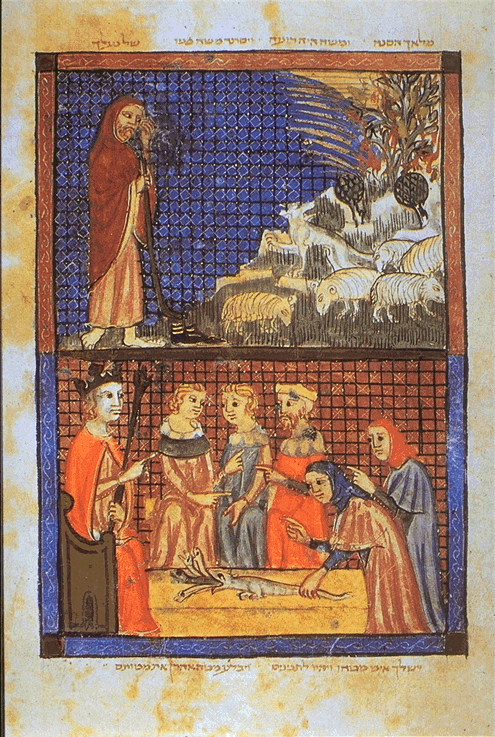
Sarajevo Haggadah, Moses and Burning Bush, top, 15th c. Spain, National Museum of Bosnia and Herzegovina

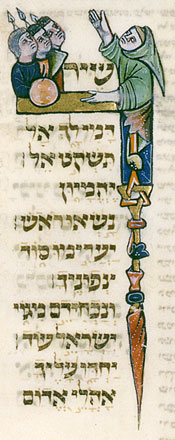
13th c. image from Parma Psalter. The main figure is Asaph, who beseeches: "O God, do not keep silence"

A number of Jewish illuminated manuscripts include representational art and illustrations, with many containing religious or biblical undertones, while others focus on law, philosophy, science, or society-based (such as ketubbot, marriage contracts) ideas. These manuscripts spanned a wide geographical array, including Europe, Northern Africa, and the East.

Figures such as Joel ben Simeon became known for their work.

Archival records from medieval Iberia confirm that Jews were painters and practitioners of the fine arts. A number of works survive.

== Bibles/Tanakhim ==
- Alba Bible
- Al-Ousta Codex
- Kennicott Bible
- Schocken Bible
- Cervera Bible
- Regensburg Pentateuch
- Parma Psalter
- Rothschild Pentateuch
- Ambrosian Tanakh
- Lisbon Bible
- Sanaa Pentateuch
- Xanten Bible

== Haggadot ==
- Barcelona Haggadah
- Golden Haggadah
- Washington Haggadah
- Sarajevo Haggadah
- Ashkenazi Haggadah
- Hispano-Moresque Haggadah
- Graziano Haggadah
- Birds' Head Haggadah
- Kaufmann Haggadah
- Sassoon Haggadah
- Sister Haggadah
- Prague Haggadah
- Rylands Haggadah
- 1739 Joseph ben David Haggadah
- Rothschild Haggadah
- Hamburg Haggadah

== Mahzorim and Siddurim ==
- Esslingen Mahzor
- Hammelburg Mahzor
- Leipzig Mahzor
- Worms Mahzor
- Montefiore Mainz Mahzor
- Rothschild Mahzor
- Tripartite Mahzor
- Furth Siddur
- Amsterdam Mahzor
- Catalan Mahzor
- Forli Siddur
- Levy Mahzor
- Michael Mahzor
- Hamilton Siddur

== Chronicles, miscellany, and other works ==
- Chroniques de la Bible
- North French Hebrew Miscellany
- Rothschild Miscellany
- Works of Maimonides, such as Guide to the Perplexed
  - Guide for the Perplexed by Ferrer Bassa 1348
  - Kaufmann Mishneh Torah
  - 1457 - ca. 1465 Mishneh Torah

== Megillot (ie, Book of Esther or scrolls of Esther) ==
- Ferrara book of Esther

== Other manuscripts by region ==
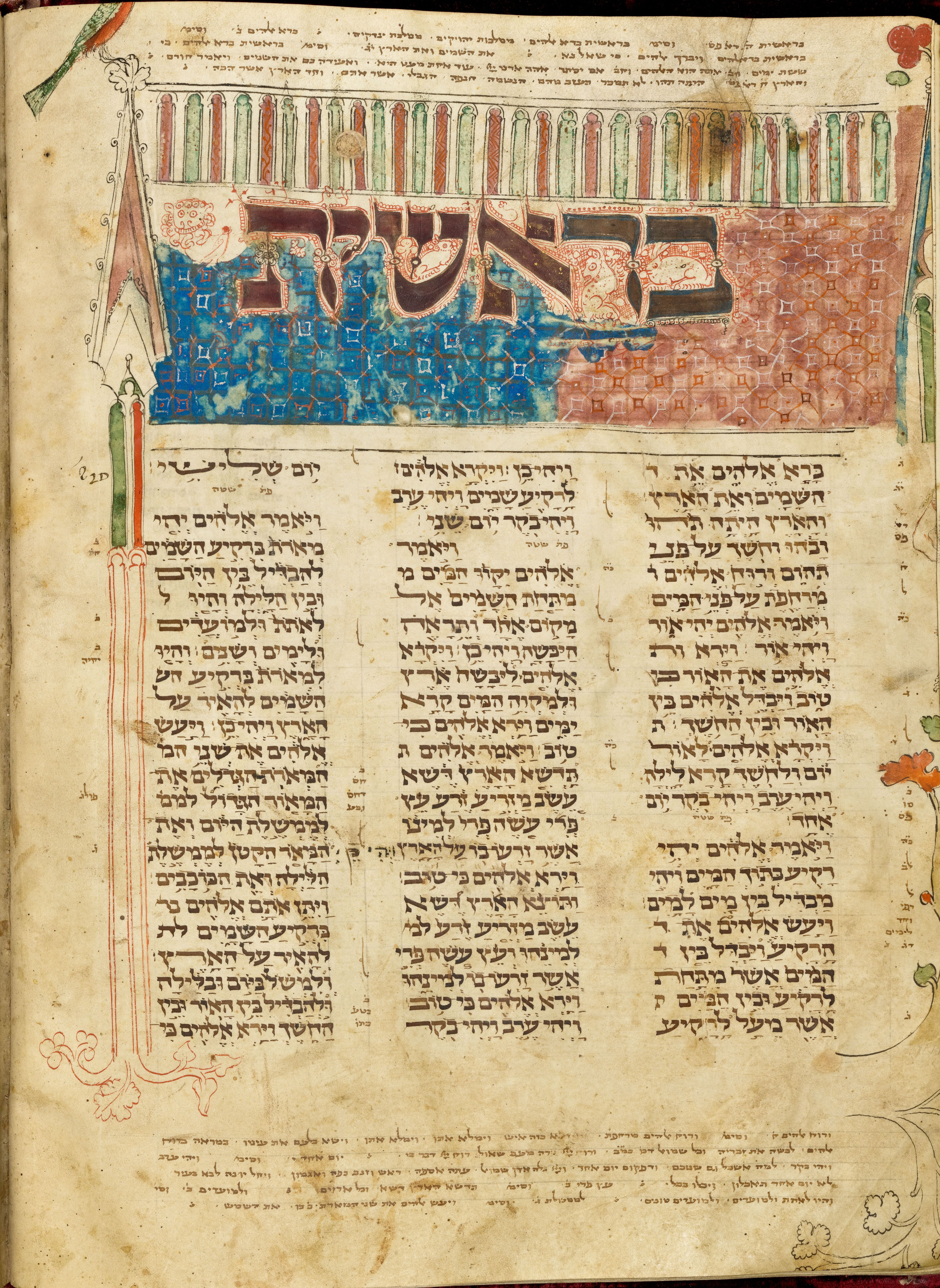
Xanten Bible (1294), New York Public Library

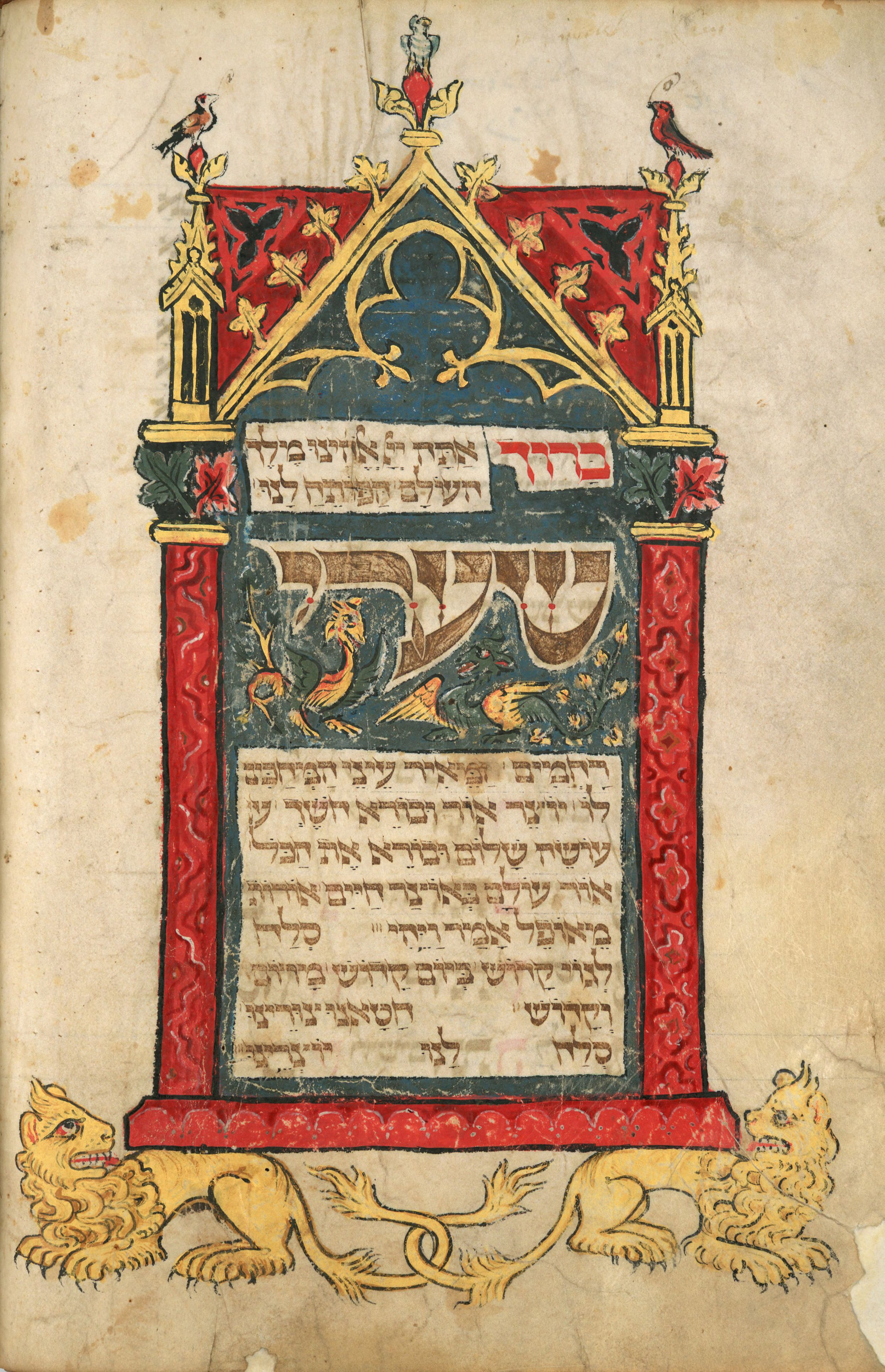
Ha-poteah lanu shaare rahamim, shararit of Yom Kippur. David bar Pesaḥ Maḥzor (14th c), NYPL

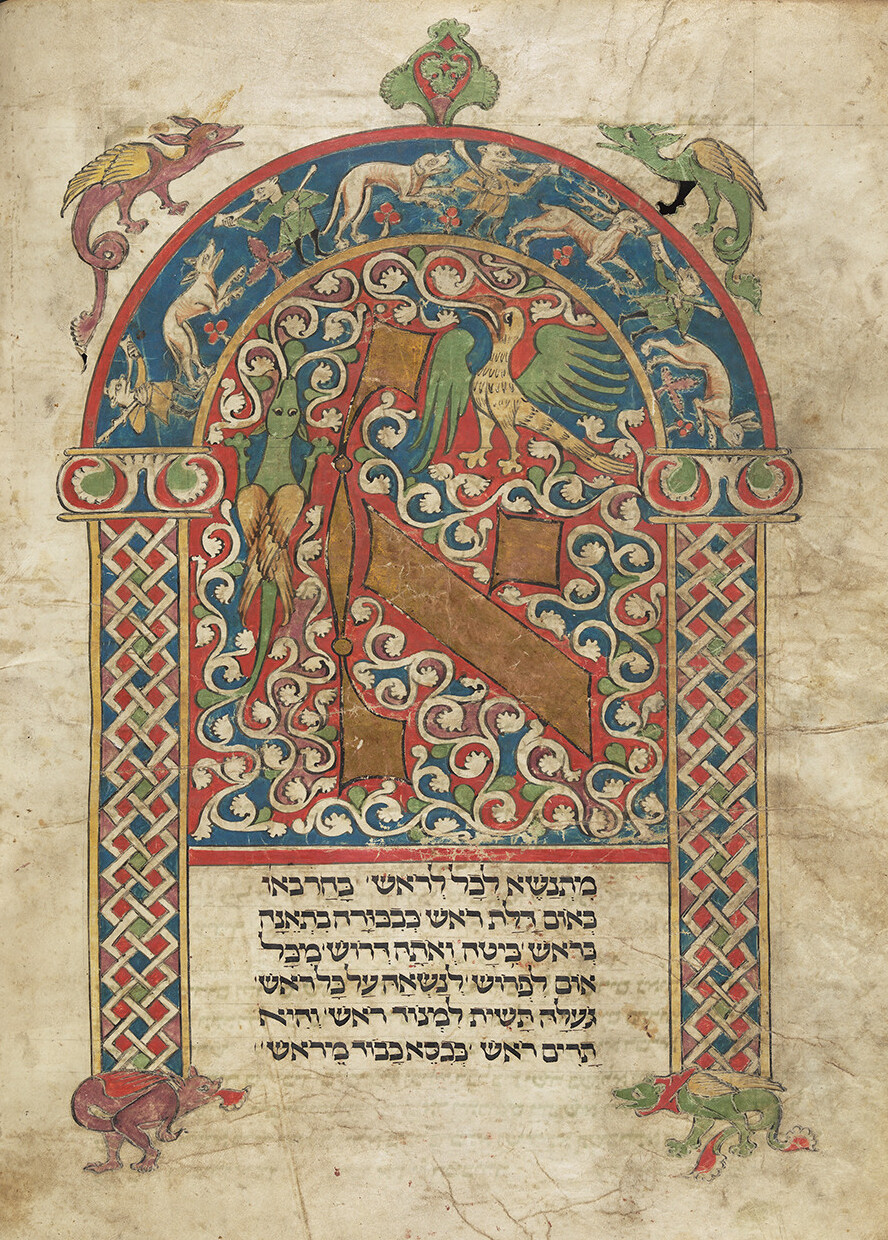
Laud Mahzor (1270), Bodleian Library

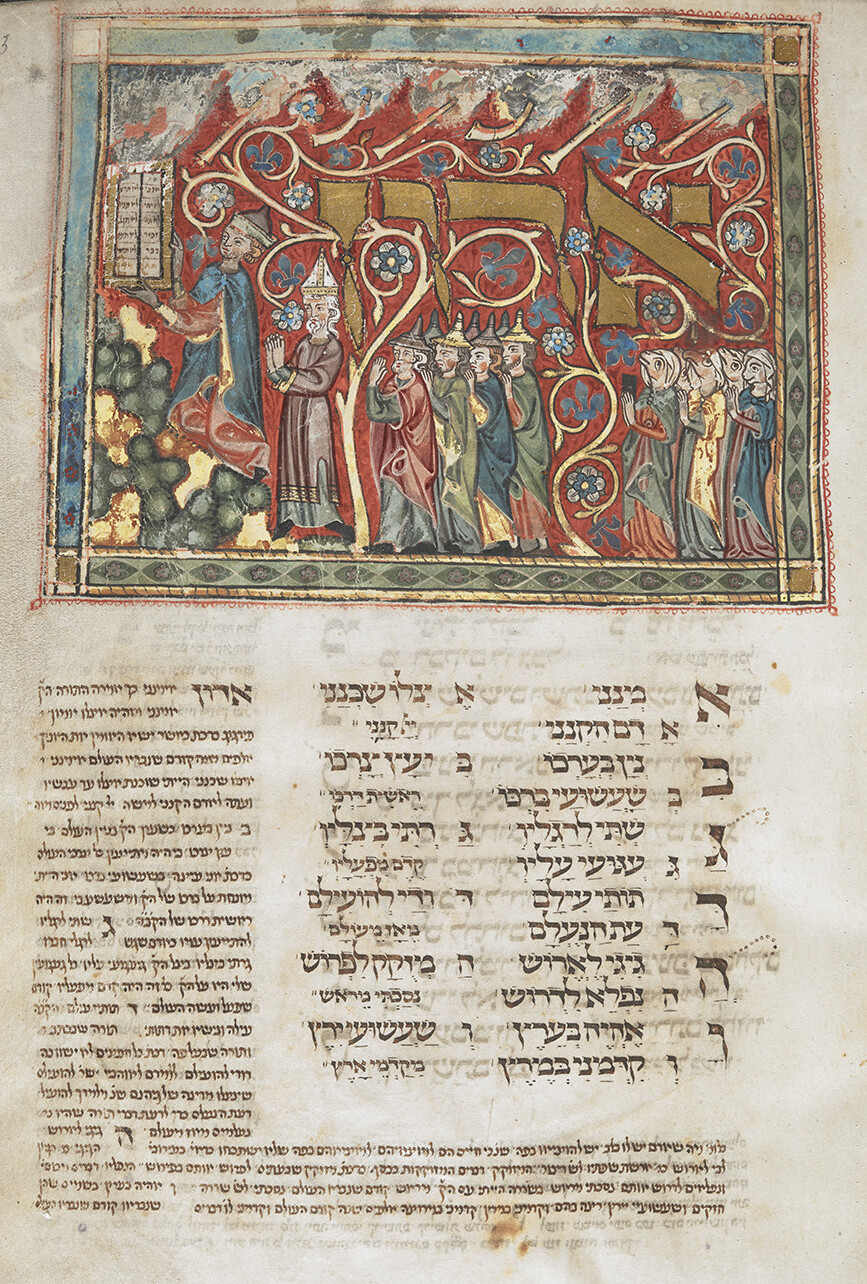
Tripartite Mahzor (1322), British Library

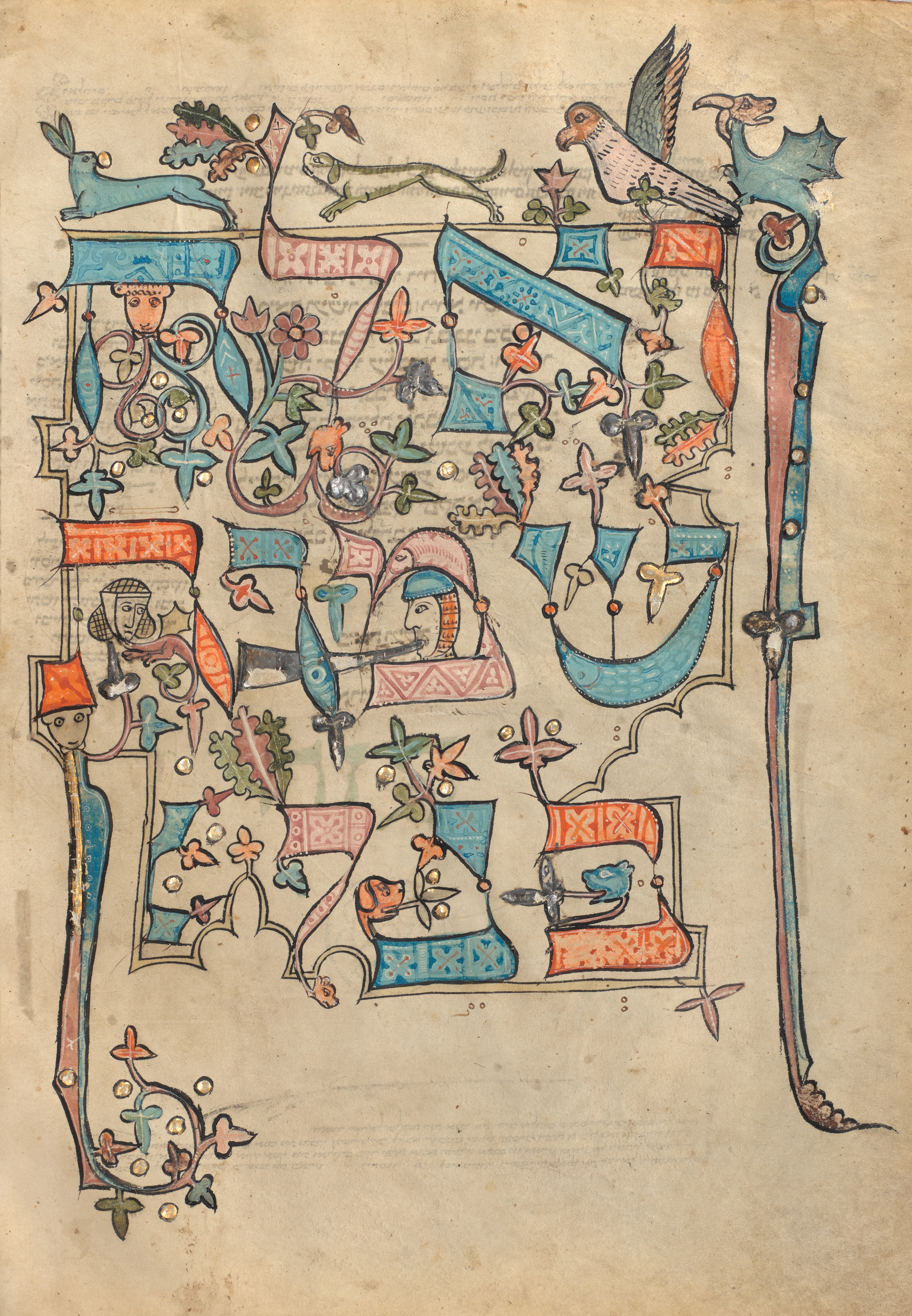
Rothschild Pentateuch (1296), Getty Museum

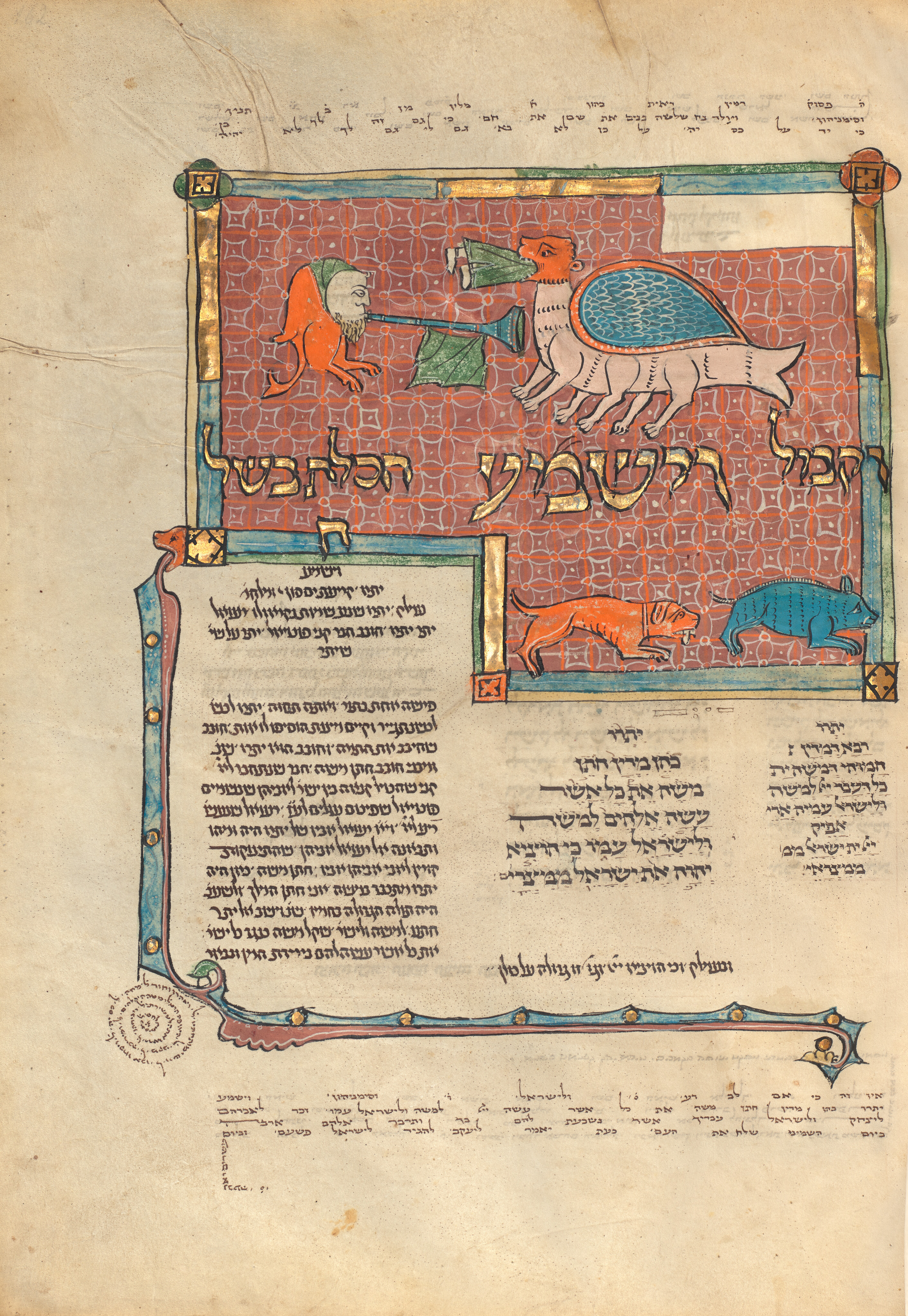
Rothschild Pentateuch

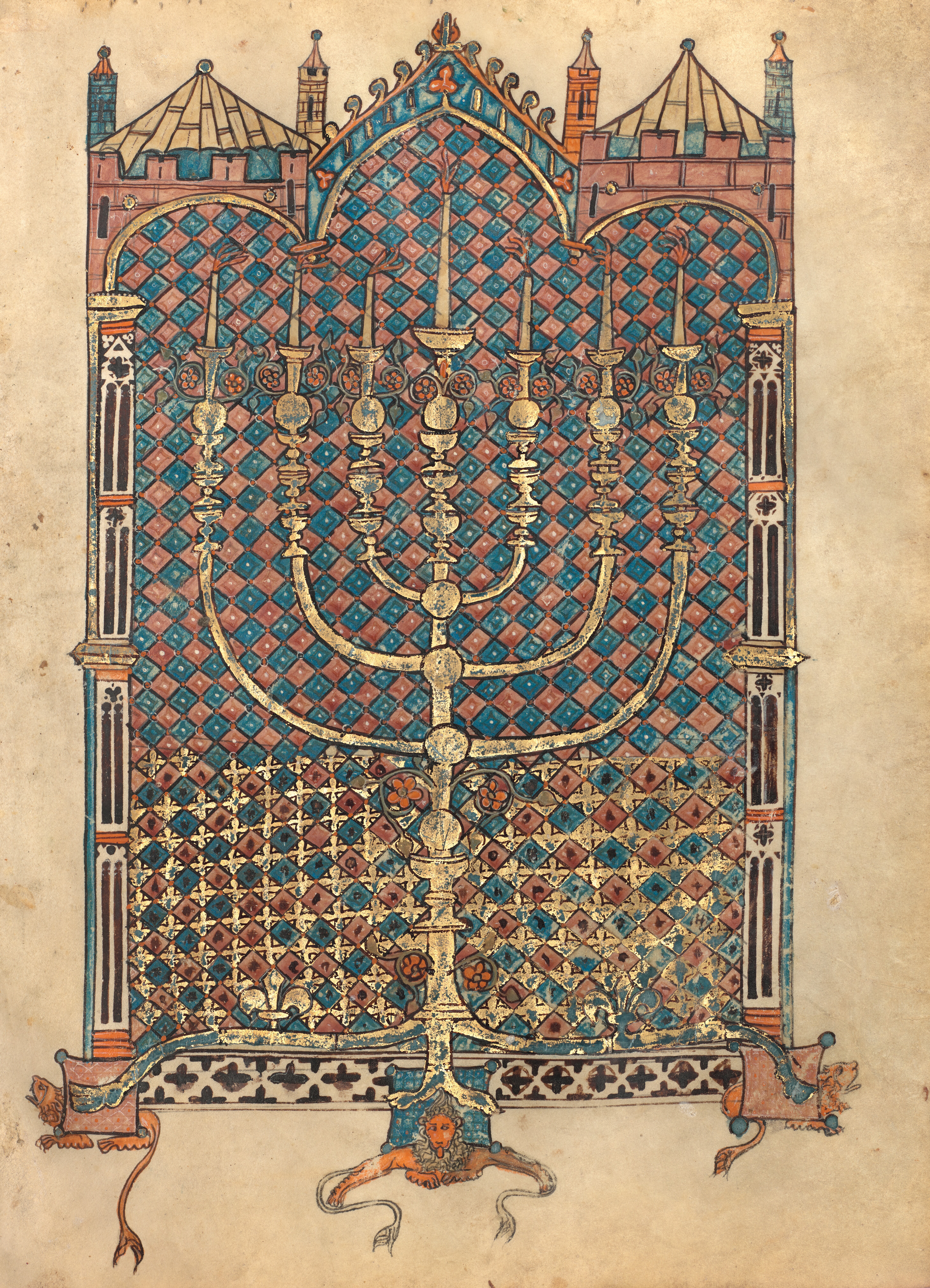
Menorah of the tabernacle, Rothschild Pentateuch

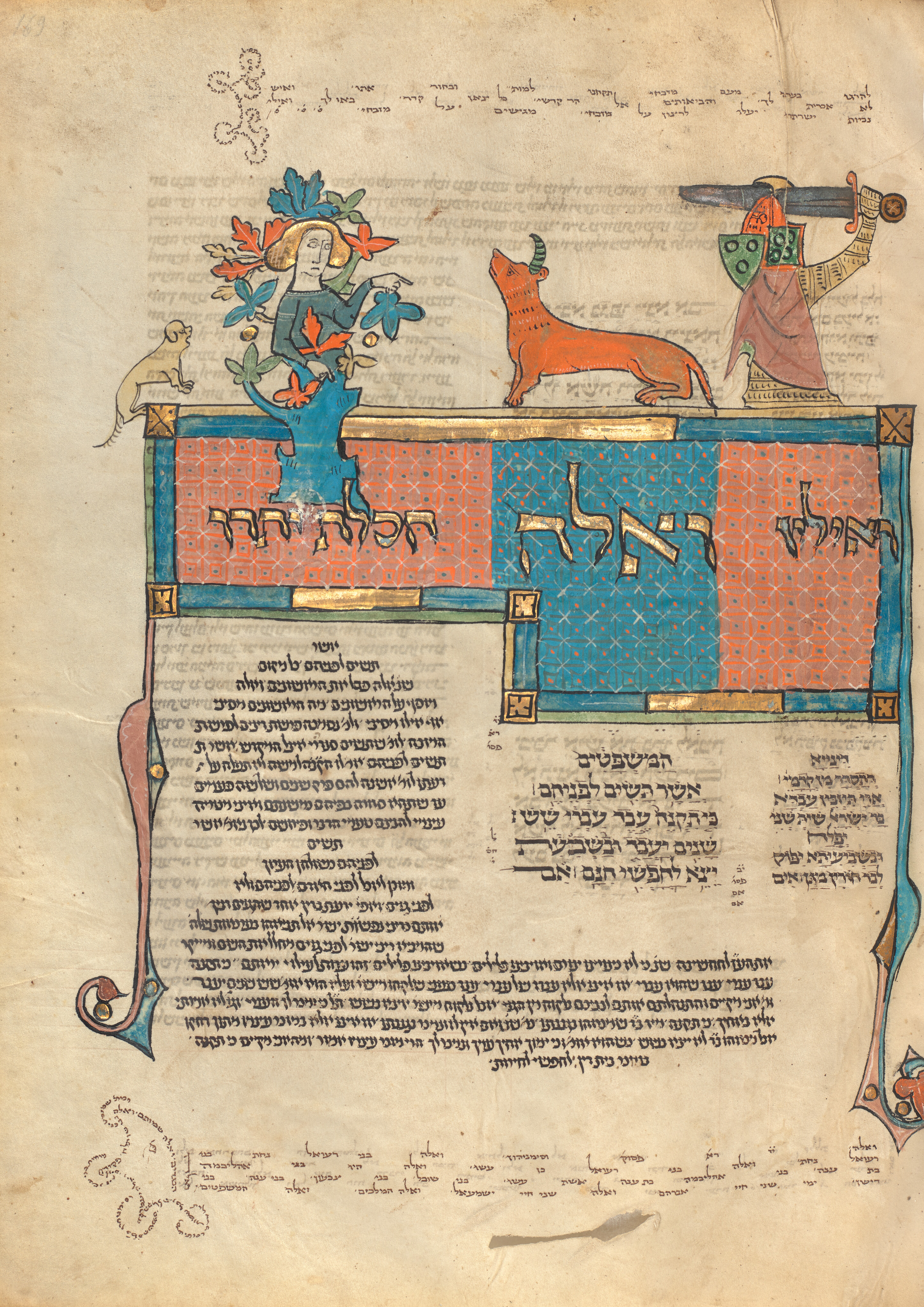
Rothschild Pentateuch

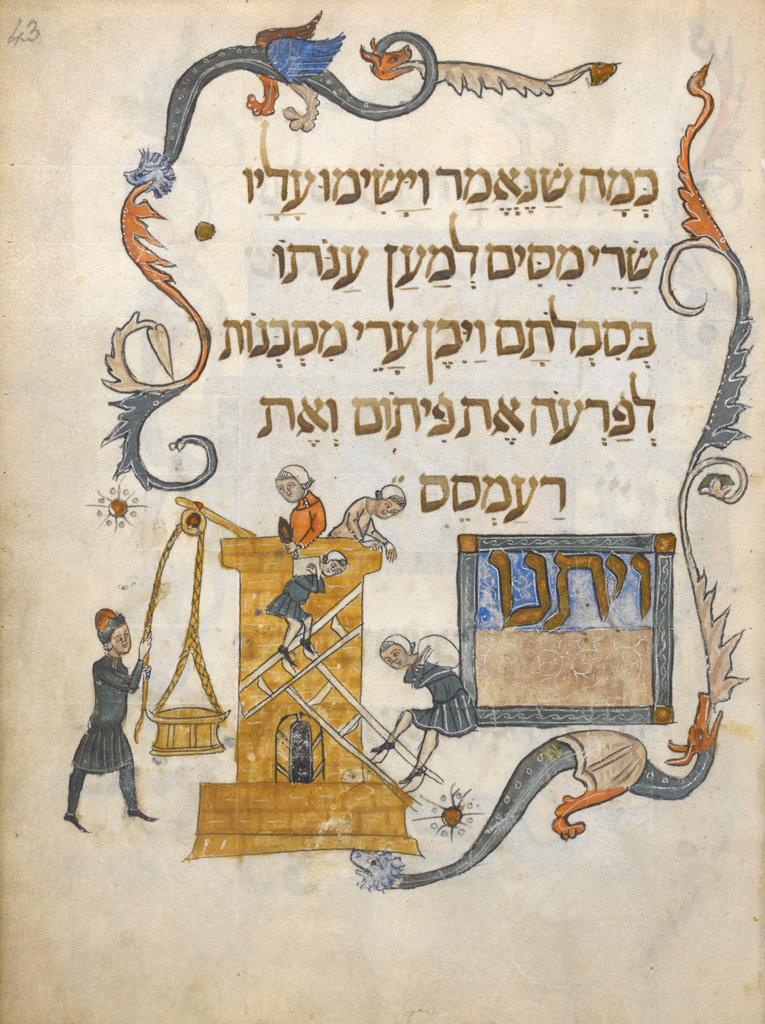
Barcelona Haggadah, 14th c., British Library

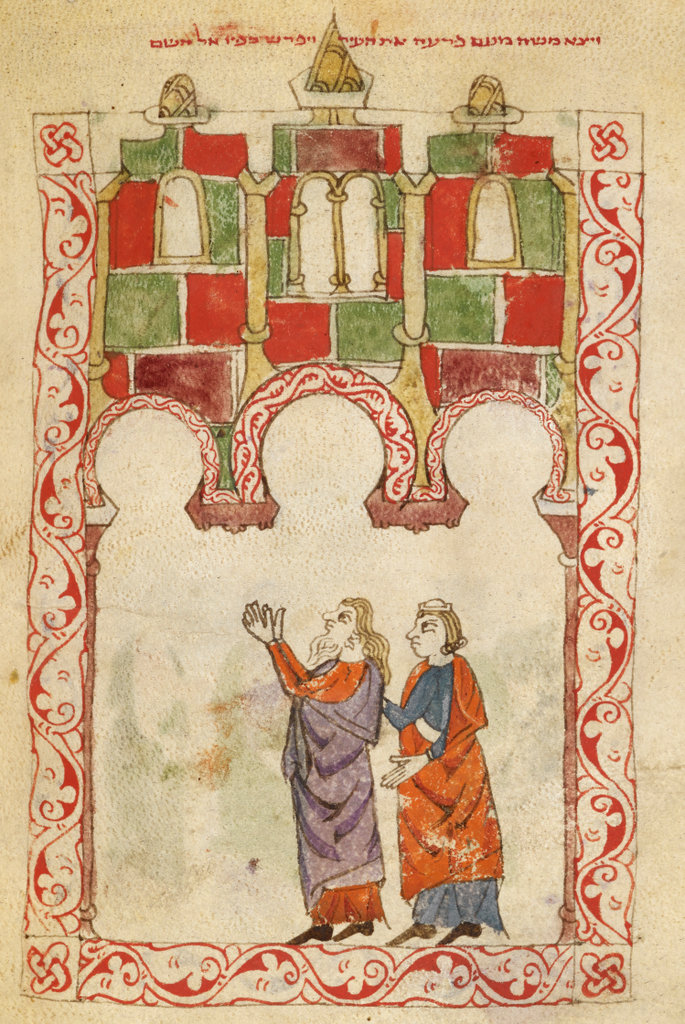
Hispano-Moresque Haggadah, depicting Moses, British Library

Spain

- Torah (Five Books of Moses), 14th century
- https://www.imj.org.il/en/wings/jewish-art-and-life/illuminating-script
- Haggadah, 1401-1520,
- "Haye ha-nefesh," 1465,

Iran (Persian Jews, aka Iranian Jews)

- Ketubah, Sanandaj (Iranian Kurdistan), 1903, https://cja.huji.ac.il/gross/browser.php?mode=set&id=45037
- Ketubbah, 1902, https://cja.huji.ac.il/gross/browser.php?mode=set&id=48992
- Ketubah, Mashhad, 1894, https://cja.huji.ac.il/gross/browser.php?mode=set&id=45036
- Shiviti, Iran, 1891, https://cja.huji.ac.il/gross/browser.php?mode=set&id=48467
- 1875, https://cja.huji.ac.il/gross/browser.php?mode=set&id=53564
- Prayer Book, 1860, https://cja.huji.ac.il/gross/browser.php?mode=set&id=53723
- "Shiviti," 1854/55, https://cja.huji.ac.il/gross/browser.php?mode=set&id=49257
- Haftarot (Shmuel ben Azaria), 1828, https://cja.huji.ac.il/gross/browser.php?mode=set&id=53776
- Ketubah, Isfahan, 1763, https://cja.huji.ac.il/gross/browser.php?mode=set&id=45782
- circa beginning of 12th century, https://mss.huc.edu/portfolio/ms-1/
- https://smarthistory.org/the-ardashirnama-judeo-persian-manuscript/
- https://www.irannamag.com/en/article/4598/
- https://www.liverpooluniversitypress.co.uk/doi/10.3828/aj.2021.17.7
- https://blogs.bl.uk/asian-and-african/2018/11/the-judeo-persian-manuscript-collection-in-the-british-library.html

Iraq

- Kurdistan, 1911, https://cja.huji.ac.il/gross/browser.php?mode=set&id=53523
- "Minchah ve-'Aravit shel Shabbat," 1886, https://cja.huji.ac.il/gross/browser.php?mode=set&id=53495
- Baghdad, 1881/82, https://cja.huji.ac.il/gross/browser.php?mode=set&id=53505
- "Seder 'Aravit le-Pesach, Shir ha-Shirim," 1854, https://cja.huji.ac.il/gross/browser.php?mode=set&id=53506
- https://cja.huji.ac.il/gross/browser.php?mode=alone&id=578109
- Judeo-Arabic Kabbalistic manuscript https://cja.huji.ac.il/gross/browser.php?mode=set&id=32976
- https://blogs.library.columbia.edu/jewishstudiesatcul/2025/02/20/manuscripts-of-the-yemenite-jewish-experience/
- Jewish purple-inked bound mini-books from Iraqi-Kurdistan https://cja.huji.ac.il/browser.php?mode=set&id=53679

Morocco

- "ha-Notein Imri Shefer," 1930, https://cja.huji.ac.il/gross/browser.php?mode=set&id=53682
- "Pizmonim," 1900, https://cja.huji.ac.il/gross/browser.php?mode=set&id=53671
- "Tzahir shel Pesach," 1900, https://cja.huji.ac.il/gross/browser.php?mode=set&id=53694
- "Chochmat ha-Yad," 1889, https://cja.huji.ac.il/gross/browser.php?mode=set&id=56197 (illustrated in blue ink)
- "Chamesh Megillot," Kurdistan, 1880, https://cja.huji.ac.il/gross/browser.php?mode=set&id=53519
- Ketubbah, Tetuan, 1879, https://cja.huji.ac.il/gross/browser.php?mode=set&id=48905
- "Tzahir shel Pesach," 1875, https://cja.huji.ac.il/gross/browser.php?mode=set&id=53714
- Ketubbah, Rabat, 1863, https://cja.huji.ac.il/gross/browser.php?mode=set&id=48911
- "Sefer Hillulah Rabah," Tangier (Tanger), 1859, https://cja.huji.ac.il/gross/browser.php?mode=set&id=53676
- Meknes Ketubbah, 1855, https://cja.huji.ac.il/gross/browser.php?mode=set&id=45774
- Book of Amulets (Pesach), Fez, 1800, https://cja.huji.ac.il/gross/browser.php?mode=set&id=53680
- "Shi'ur Komah," 1789, https://cja.huji.ac.il/gross/browser.php?mode=set&id=53664
- "Chaim ben Yosef Vital, Otzerot Chaim," Marrakech (Marrakesh), 1751/52, https://cja.huji.ac.il/gross/browser.php?mode=set&id=53567

Afghanistan

- Shiviti, 1930s, https://cja.huji.ac.il/browser.php?mode=set&id=48570
- Ketubbah (marriage contract), 1899, https://cja.huji.ac.il/browser.php?mode=set&id=7205
- Ketubbah Herat," 1894, https://cja.huji.ac.il/browser.php?mode=set&id=18879
- Ketubbah, 1891, https://cja.huji.ac.il/browser.php?mode=set&id=18880
- Ketubah, Herat, 1861, https://cja.huji.ac.il/gross/browser.php?mode=set&id=45038

Yemen

- Dream Interpretation, 1919, https://cja.huji.ac.il/gross/browser.php?mode=set&id=53782
- 1850, https://cja.huji.ac.il/gross/browser.php?mode=set&id=53808 (painted, red and black colors)
- "Shimushei Sarim," 1875, https://cja.huji.ac.il/gross/browser.php?mode=set&id=53791
- Ketubbah, 1836, https://cja.huji.ac.il/gross/browser.php?mode=set&id=45773
- "Yitzhak Aboab, Menorat ha-Meor," Yemen, 1826/27, https://cja.huji.ac.il/gross/browser.php?mode=set&id=53736
- "Yamim Noraim," circa 1825 https://cja.huji.ac.il/gross/browser.php?mode=set&id=53781
- "Yitzhak Aboab, Menorat ha-Meor," 1745, https://cja.huji.ac.il/gross/browser.php?mode=set&id=53786 (brown and black colors)
- Ketubah, San'a (Sana'a), 1735, https://cja.huji.ac.il/gross/browser.php?mode=set&id=45772
- Jewish Bible, 1600s, https://mss.huc.edu/portfolio/ms-666/
- "Chamishah Chumshei Torah," circa 1500, https://cja.huji.ac.il/gross/browser.php?mode=set&id=53783 (red, black, and browns)
- "Netanel Ben Yishaya, Midrash Nur Eltzalem," before 1500, https://cja.huji.ac.il/gross/browser.php?mode=set&id=53784

Israel

- "Yit'aleh Ha-Meitiv Ve-ha-Mashpi'ah Ha-Chesed," 1960, https://cja.huji.ac.il/gross/browser.php?mode=set&id=50053
- "Ets Haim, Tree of Jewish Kings and prophets," Herzliya, 1937, https://cja.huji.ac.il/gross/browser.php?mode=set&id=52751
- "Ze'ev Raban Esther," Jerusalem, 1928, https://cja.huji.ac.il/gross/browser.php?mode=set&id=53836
- "Ha-Yoshevet be-Ganim Chaverim Makshivim le-Kolcha Hashmi'eini," 1925, https://cja.huji.ac.il/gross/browser.php?mode=set&id=50052
- Scroll of Ruth, Jerusalem, 1925, https://cja.huji.ac.il/gross/browser.php?mode=set&id=49777
- Ketubbah, Nablus (Shechem), 1917, https://cja.huji.ac.il/gross/browser.php?mode=set&id=48865
- Shiviti, Jerusalem, circa 1910, https://cja.huji.ac.il/gross/browser.php?mode=set&id=48468
- "Sar Shalom ben Yitzhak Mizrachi Didya Shar'abi, Siddur Kavanot Ha-Rashash," Jerusalem, 1907, https://cja.huji.ac.il/gross/browser.php?mode=alone&id=574450
- "Sefer Zikaron," Safed, 1903, https://cja.huji.ac.il/gross/browser.php?mode=set&id=53472 (purple, golds, browns)
- Samaritan Illustration, Nablus (Shechem), circa 1900, https://cja.huji.ac.il/gross/browser.php?mode=set&id=49973
- "Prayer for Rosh Chodesh," Jerusalem, circa 1900, https://cja.huji.ac.il/gross/browser.php?mode=set&id=49807
- "Sar Shalom ben Yitzhak Mizrachi Didya Shar'abi, Siddur ha-Rashash," Jerusalem, circa 1900, https://cja.huji.ac.il/gross/browser.php?mode=set&id=53441
- "Pitom ha-Ketoret," 1900, https://cja.huji.ac.il/gross/browser.php?mode=set&id=53475
- Ketubbah, Jerusalem, 1896, https://cja.huji.ac.il/gross/browser.php?mode=set&id=48914
- New Year (Rosh Hashanah) greetings, Jerusalem, 1888, https://cja.huji.ac.il/gross/browser.php?mode=set&id=52750
- Ketubbah, Jerusalem, 1879, https://cja.huji.ac.il/gross/browser.php?mode=set&id=48870
- 1875, https://cja.huji.ac.il/gross/browser.php?mode=set&id=49758
- "Shiviti," 1875, https://cja.huji.ac.il/gross/browser.php?mode=set&id=49370
- Chanukah Blessings, circa 1875, https://cja.huji.ac.il/gross/browser.php?mode=set&id=50011
- Ketubah, Jerusalem, 1874, https://cja.huji.ac.il/gross/browser.php?mode=set&id=45035
- "Piyuttim," 1850, https://cja.huji.ac.il/gross/browser.php?mode=set&id=53427
- "Eretz Israel," 1800, https://cja.huji.ac.il/gross/browser.php?mode=set&id=53445
- "Avraham ben Baruch Mizrachi, Zikaron le-Benei Yisrael," Gaza, 1700, https://cja.huji.ac.il/gross/browser.php?mode=set&id=53692
- 12th or 13th century, https://mss.huc.edu/portfolio/ms-8/
- Samaritan Bible, 1232, https://www.nypl.org/events/exhibitions/galleries/beauty-and-history-collections-oldest-manuscripts/item/16396

Turkey

- Seder Tefilot Yesarot u-Barot, Istanbul (Constantinople), 1734, https://cja.huji.ac.il/gross/browser.php?mode=set&id=53727

Greece

- Yehudah ben Amram Diwan, Thessaloniki (Salonika), 1825, https://cja.huji.ac.il/gross/browser.php?mode=set&id=53715
- Ha-Sefer shel Pizmonim, Rhodes, 1872, https://cja.huji.ac.il/gross/browser.php?mode=set&id=53716 (blue and black ink)
- Ketubbah, Corfu, 1830, https://cja.huji.ac.il/gross/browser.php?mode=set&id=48906

France

- Ketubbah, Bordeaux, 1748, https://cja.huji.ac.il/gross/browser.php?mode=set&id=48901
- Mahzor (Prayer Book for the Holy Days), copied by Hayyim ben Isaac, 13th/14th centuries, https://braginskycollection.com/manuscripts-and-printed-books/

Italy

- "Piyutim le-Simchat Torah," 1825, https://cja.huji.ac.il/gross/browser.php?mode=set&id=53510
- Ketubbah, Pomponesco, 1820, https://cja.huji.ac.il/gross/browser.php?mode=set&id=50638
- "Tefilot Neged Magefah," 1800, https://cja.huji.ac.il/gross/browser.php?mode=set&id=53659
- "Zeh ha-Sefer shel Shnei Ketubot shel Shavuot," Ancona, 1800, https://cja.huji.ac.il/gross/browser.php?mode=set&id=53516
- Micrography, Italy, circa 1800, https://cja.huji.ac.il/gross/browser.php?mode=set&id=49753
- "Shiviti," circa 1775, https://cja.huji.ac.il/gross/browser.php?mode=set&id=49246
- 1761, https://mss.huc.edu/portfolio/esther-scroll-vi-7/
- "Invitation for Chatan Torah," Pesaro, 1723, https://cja.huji.ac.il/gross/browser.php?mode=set&id=50049
- Get (divorce contract), Mantua, 1699, https://cja.huji.ac.il/gross/browser.php?mode=set&id=45740
- Ketubbah, Senigallia, circa 1675, https://cja.huji.ac.il/gross/browser.php?mode=set&id=48900
- Ketubbah (Marriage contract), Rome, 1638, https://cja.huji.ac.il/gross/browser.php?mode=set&id=48994
- GFC Moshe ben Avraham Pescarolo Esther Scroll, Ferrara, 1610s, https://cja.huji.ac.il/gross/browser.php?mode=set&id=35193
- Esther Scroll, Rome, 1570-1572, https://mss.huc.edu/portfolio/esther-scroll-ix-6/
- Minhag Roma (The Roman Rite), circa 1500, https://braginskycollection.com/manuscripts-and-printed-books/
- Jewish Bible, Rome, 1401, https://mss.huc.edu/portfolio/ms-acc-167/

India

- "Likutei Dinim," 1940, https://cja.huji.ac.il/gross/browser.php?mode=set&id=53493 (red and black lettering)
- Ketubah, Kolkata (Calcutta), 1924, https://cja.huji.ac.il/gross/browser.php?mode=set&id=45795
- Ketubah, 1910, https://cja.huji.ac.il/gross/browser.php?mode=set&id=45820
- Ketubbah, Calcutta, 1866, https://www.nypl.org/events/exhibitions/galleries/jewish-traditions-around-world
- "Zevach Todah," Cochin, 1799, https://cja.huji.ac.il/gross/browser.php?mode=alone&id=576824 (brown, black, yellow, blue, and green colors)
- Ketubah, Kochi (Cochin), 1790, https://cja.huji.ac.il/gross/browser.php?mode=set&id=45778

Lithuania

- Ketubbah, Trakai (Troki), 1762, https://cja.huji.ac.il/gross/browser.php?mode=set&id=48903

Egypt

- Micrography with Kaddish prayer, circa 1900, https://cja.huji.ac.il/gross/browser.php?mode=set&id=49771
- "Aharon ben Raphael Tawil, Zevah ha-Shlemim," 1700 https://cja.huji.ac.il/gross/browser.php?mode=set&id=53616

Lebanon

- Ketubah, Beirut, 1877, https://cja.huji.ac.il/gross/browser.php?mode=set&id=45801

The Netherlands

- "Talmud Torah Libro," Amsterdam, 1744, https://cja.huji.ac.il/gross/browser.php?mode=set&id=53488

Hungary

- Pinkas (communal records), Budapest, 1807, https://cja.huji.ac.il/gross/browser.php?mode=set&id=53491
- Shiviti, Budapest, 1795, https://cja.huji.ac.il/gross/browser.php?mode=set&id=49811

Ukraine

- "Shavuot ketubbah," Galicia, 1914, https://cja.huji.ac.il/gross/browser.php?mode=set&id=45457
- "Zeh ha-Pinkas Shayach le-Chavurah di'Ner Tamid," 1830, https://cja.huji.ac.il/gross/browser.php?mode=set&id=53414
- 1800, https://cja.huji.ac.il/gross/browser.php?mode=set&id=53416
- Ketubah, Kirkeir, 1796, https://cja.huji.ac.il/gross/browser.php?mode=set&id=45791
- "Rabbi Yitzhak ben Shlomo Luria, Siddur for the Whole Year by way of the Kabbalah of Ha'ari," circa 1750, https://cja.huji.ac.il/gross/browser.php?mode=set&id=53417
- Kabbalistic manuscript, circa 1750, https://cja.huji.ac.il/gross/browser.php?mode=set&id=53439

Romania

- "Zeh ha-Sha'ar, Iași (Jassy)," 1875, https://cja.huji.ac.il/gross/browser.php?mode=set&id=53374

Algeria

- "Book of Amulets," Oran, circa 1900, https://cja.huji.ac.il/gross/browser.php?mode=set&id=53353
- "Hakavanot by Yitzhak Abulchir," Tlemcen, 1744, https://cja.huji.ac.il/gross/browser.php?mode=set&id=53351
- "Piyyutim by Natanel Crescas," Algeria, circa 1625, https://cja.huji.ac.il/gross/browser.php?mode=set&id=53350

Uzbekistan

- "Shiviti," 1883, https://cja.huji.ac.il/gross/browser.php?mode=set&id=49449

Syria

- Jewish Bible, 1616, https://mss.huc.edu/portfolio/ms_659/

Russia

- Jewish Bible, 1860, https://mss.huc.edu/portfolio/ms-751/

Jordan

- Inscribed gold amulets, 4-7th centuries, https://www.nypl.org/events/exhibitions/galleries/beauty-and-history-collections-oldest-manuscripts/item/14274

== See also ==
- Aniconism in Judaism
- Jewish art
