= Aniconism in Judaism =

Prohibition against idolatry

Aniconism in Judaism refers to the idea that Judaism forbids the creation of "graven images," commonly understood to mean the prohibition of idolatry and idol worship. While Judaism is a logocentric religion, Jews were not under a blanket ban on visual art, despite common assumptions to the contrary, and throughout Jewish history and the history of Jewish art, created architectural designs and decorations of synagogues, decorative funerary monuments, illuminated manuscripts, embroidery and other decorative or artistic religious items.

In a refutation of the belief in an aniconic Judaism, and more generally in the underestimation of Jewish visual arts, modern secular historians believe that the phenomenon is a modern construction, and that "Jewish aniconism crystallized simultaneously with the construction of modern Jewish identities". According to current scholarship, the notion of a total prohibition of figural representation in the Biblical and Hellenistic-Roman periods is untenable.

Until the 20th century, Judaism was commonly believed to have been aniconic. The view was probably first challenged by David Kaufmann, who marshalled a large and comprehensive corpus of data in order to prove it untenable. He was the first to popularize the term "Jewish art" in an article published in 1878, and is regarded as the founder of the scholarly discipline of Jewish art history. His disciple Dr. Samuel Krauss wrote in 1901:

As late as ten years ago it would have been absurd to speak about a Jewish art. It is Kaufmann's own merit to have uncovered this art. Not only did he have to prove that such an art existed, he also had to prove that it could exist, as he showed that the idea that the prohibition of images would obstruct the development of such an art was mistaken, and even established it as an irrefutable fact that the art in wide areas was not prohibited insofar as no worship was associated with it.

== Prohibition in the Torah ==
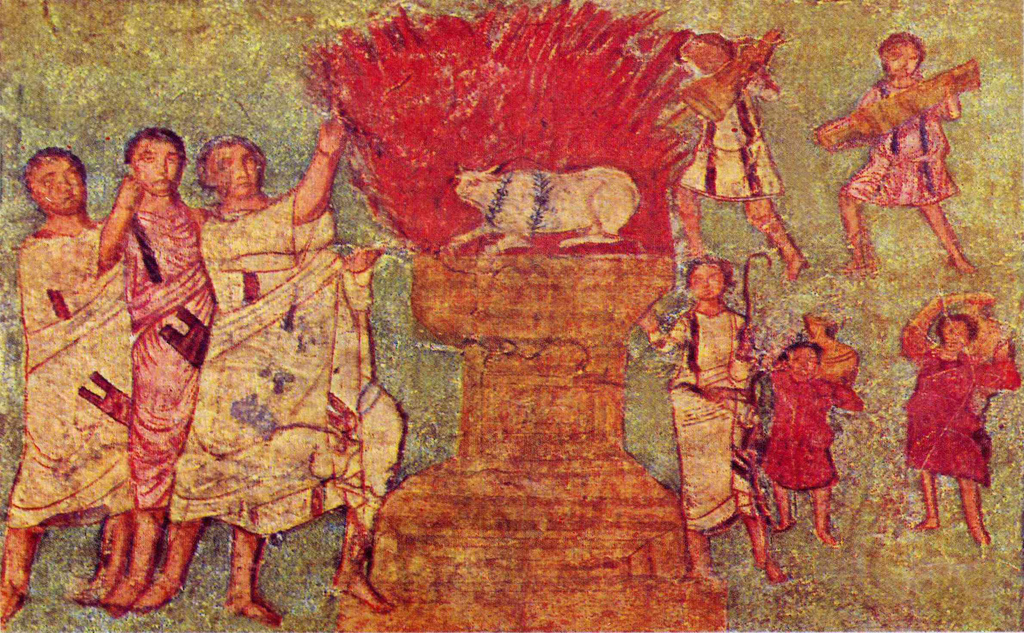
Golden Calf, miracle of Elijah, 244-256 CE, fresco from Dura Europos synagogue

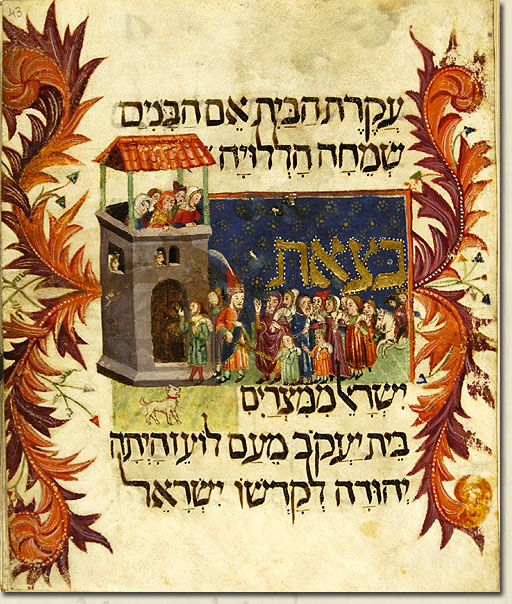
14th century hagaddah, depicting Moses leading the people (David Kaufmann collection)

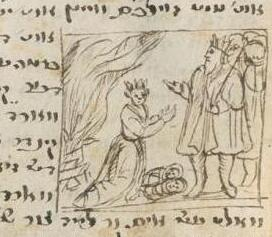
An illustration of human figures by Yitzhak bar Yuda Reutlingen in a Yiddish manuscript collection of stories dated to 1580–1600

A number of verses in the Torah/Tanakh refer to prohibitions against the creation of various forms of images, invariably linked directly with idolatry. The strongest source is based on what Judaism counts as the second of the Ten Commandments:

Thou shalt not make unto thee a graven image, nor any manner of likeness, of any thing that is in heaven above, or that is in the earth beneath, or that is in the water under the earth; thou shalt not bow down unto them, nor serve them; for I the LORD thy God am a jealous God, visiting the iniquity of the fathers upon the children unto the third and fourth generation of them that hate Me; and showing mercy unto the thousandth generation of them that love Me and keep My commandments.

— Exodus 20:3–6

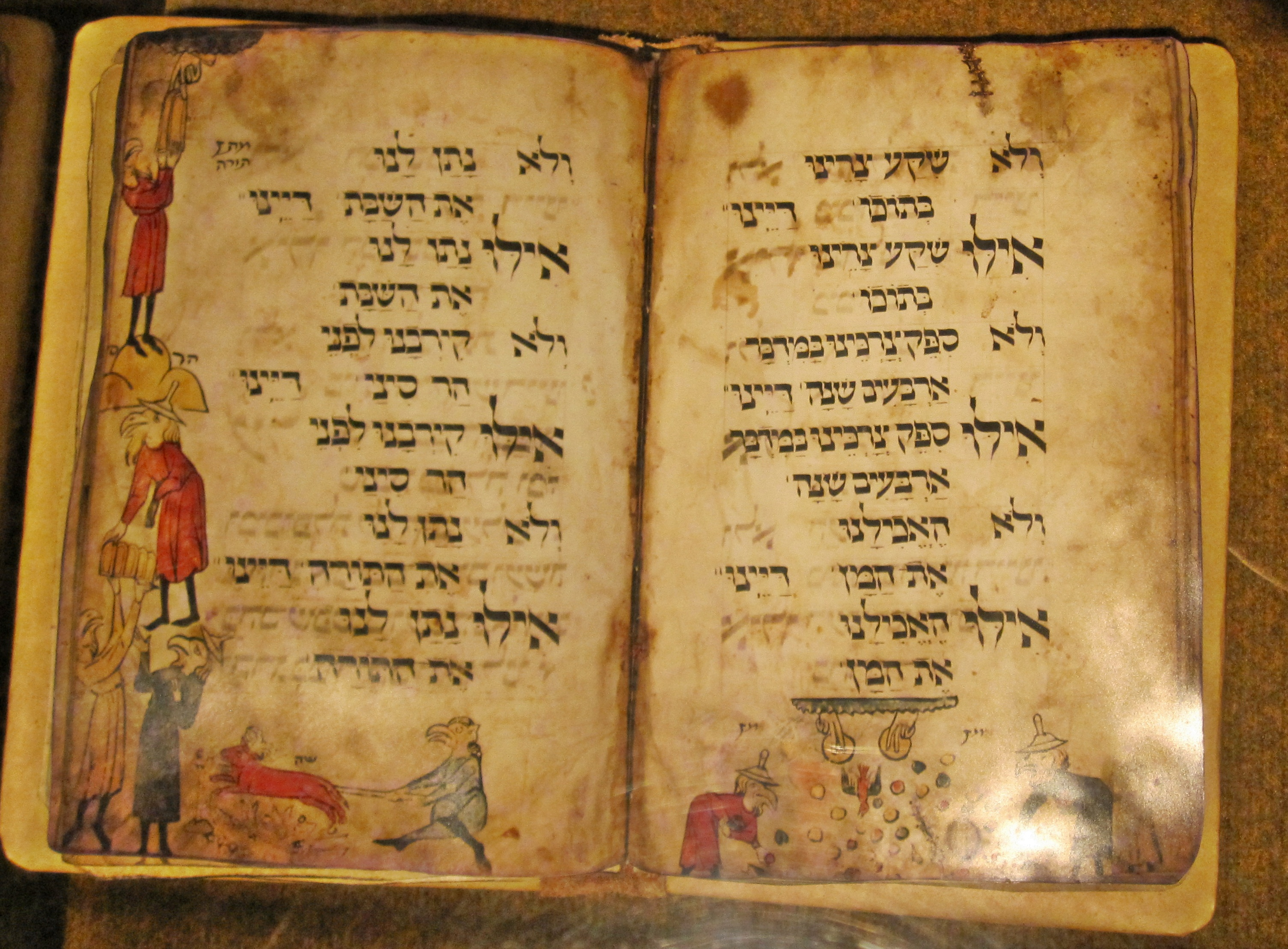
Detail of Dayenu in the Birds' Head Haggadah

Leviticus 26:1 reads:

Ye shall make you no idols, neither shall ye rear you up a graven image, or a pillar, neither shall ye place any figured stone in your land, to bow down unto it; for I am the LORD your God.

— Leviticus 26:1

Similar injunctions appear in Numbers 33:52, Deuteronomy 4:16, and 27:15. In all cases, the creation of the image is associated with idolatry, and indeed, the words commonly translated as 'image' or some variant thereof (פסל pesel, שקוץ shikuts) are generally used interchangeably with words typically translated as 'idol' (e.g. אליל elil). (An important exception is צלם tselem, used in such verses as Genesis 1:26: "let us make man in our image", where this word for 'image' was not associated with idols.)

== In traditional Orthodox Halakha ==
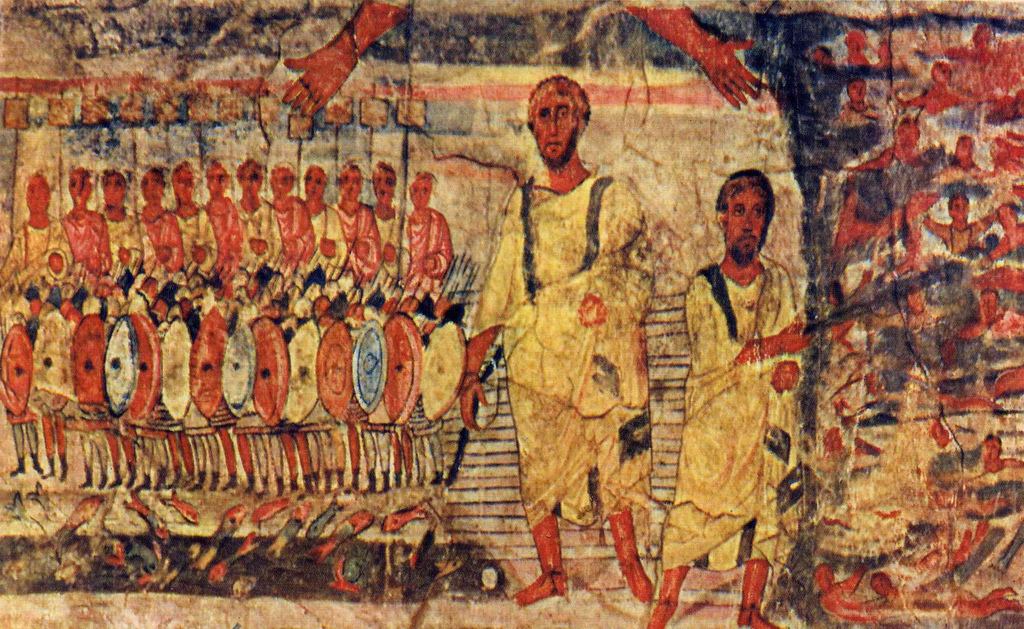
Crossing the Red Sea, from Dura Europos synagogue, with two Hands of God, 3rd century

Despite the semantic association with idols, halakha (Jewish law) as taught by the Shulkhan Aruch (1563) interprets the verses as prohibiting the creation of certain types of graven images of people, angels, or astronomical bodies, whether or not they are actually used as idols. The Shulkhan Aruch states: "It is forbidden to make complete solid or raised images of people or angels, or any images of heavenly bodies except for purposes of study".

A breakdown can be found in the Shulkhan Aruch, section Yoreh De'ah (Kitzur Shulchan Aruch 168:1), which takes the literal meaning of פסל pesel as "graven image" (from the root פסל p-s-l, 'to engrave'.) The prohibition is therefore seen as applying specifically to certain forms of sculpture and depictions of the human face.

== In historical periods ==
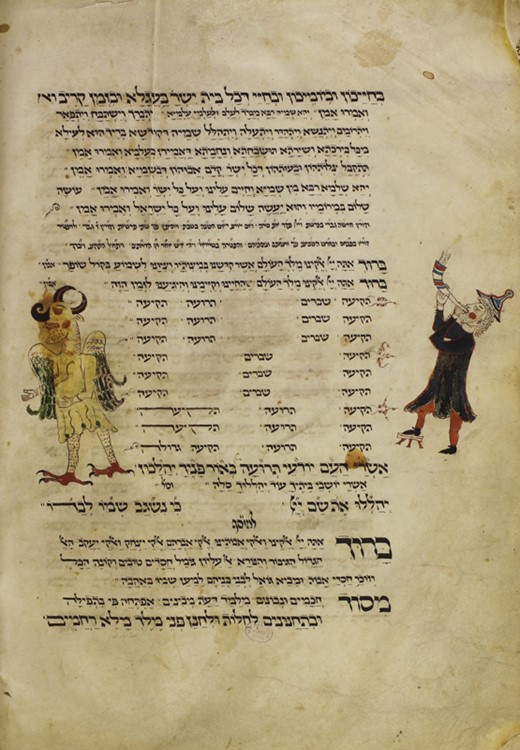
Shofar-Blower Chasing Away Satan, Mahzor, c. 1270–90, South Germany. Budapest: Library of the Hungarian Academy of Sciences (Kaufmann, Ms. A388, vol. II, f. 12v)

Art historians believe that there was a tradition in antiquity of illuminated manuscript scrolls of books from the Tanakh among Hellenized Jews that influenced Christian works of the Late Antique and Early Medieval periods whose iconography is thought to derive from works in this tradition. Examples of the later works include the Joshua Roll and, more controversially, the Utrecht Psalter.

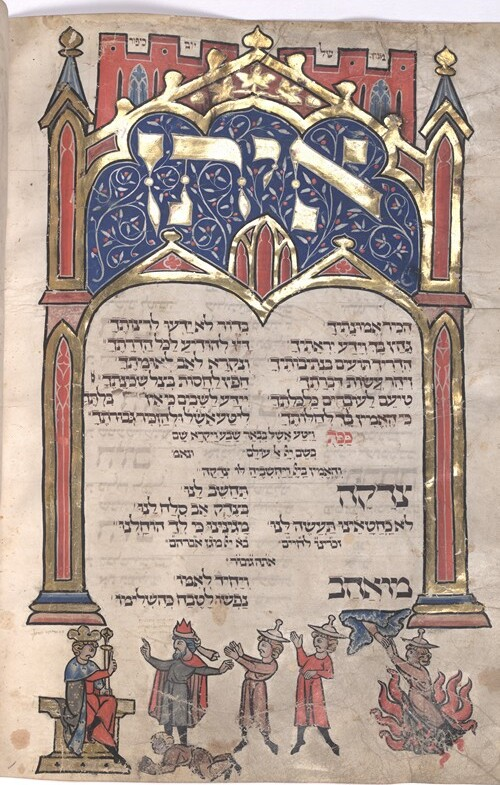
Leipzig Mahzor, hand of God delivering Abraham from the fiery furnace, 1320

The 3rd century CE Dura-Europos synagogue in Syria has large areas of wall paintings with figures of the prophets and others, and narrative scenes. There are several representations of the Hand of God, suggesting that this motif reached Christian art from Judaism. A virtually unique Christian mosaic depiction of the Ark of the Covenant (806) at Germigny-des-Prés, which includes the hand, is believed also to be derived from Jewish iconography; the Ark also appears at Dura-Europos. Several ancient synagogues in the land of Israel have also been excavated, revealing large floor-mosaics with figurative elements, especially animals and representations of the Zodiac. Another hypothesis is that this iconography reflects a third branch of Judaism, Synagogal Judaism, with some stylistic elements intermediate between that of ancient Rabbinic Judaism and Jewish Christianity.

Some of these, notably at Naaran in the West Bank, have had the living figures removed, leaving inanimate symbols such as the Temple menorah intact. It has been proposed that this was done by the Jewish community in the 6th or early 7th century, as part of a controversy within Judaism over images that paralleled that within Christianity leading to the Byzantine iconoclasm, leading to a stricter attitude towards images, at least in synagogues. There is also evidence that from about 570 new synagogue mosaics were aniconic. An alternative explanation for the removals is that they were done after the Muslim conquest, and related to the decree of Caliph Yazid II in 721 (although this referred to Christian images). The decoration of cave walls and sarcophagi at the Beit She'arim necropolis also uses images, some drawn from Hellenistic pagan mythology, in the 2nd to 4th centuries CE.

Some illustrations from the Middle Ages feature fantastic creatures—usually animal-headed humanoids, even when the depictions are quite clearly meant to be those of historical or mythological humans, known as zoocephalic figures. A well-known example is the Birds' Head Haggadah (Germany, circa 1300). Although it is theorized that zoocephalic art is to circumvent this prohibition, the fact that some manuscripts also include human faces casts doubt on this assumption. The reasons for this illustration style are not fully understood.

The Ambrosian Bible or Ambrosian Tanakh of 1236 by Jacob ben Samuel and Joseph ben Kalonymus is one of the earliest Ashkenazic illuminated manuscripts and biblical codices. It contains figural representation and depictions of biblical figures such as Adam and Eve, Abraham, Isaac, Jacob or Joseph, Moses, Solomon, David and others. Some of the figures appear with faces obscured or zoocephalic. It was made for a patron probably from Ulm.

The Leipzig Mahzor also employs a zoocephalic method to depict humans.

=== Illuminated manuscripts ===
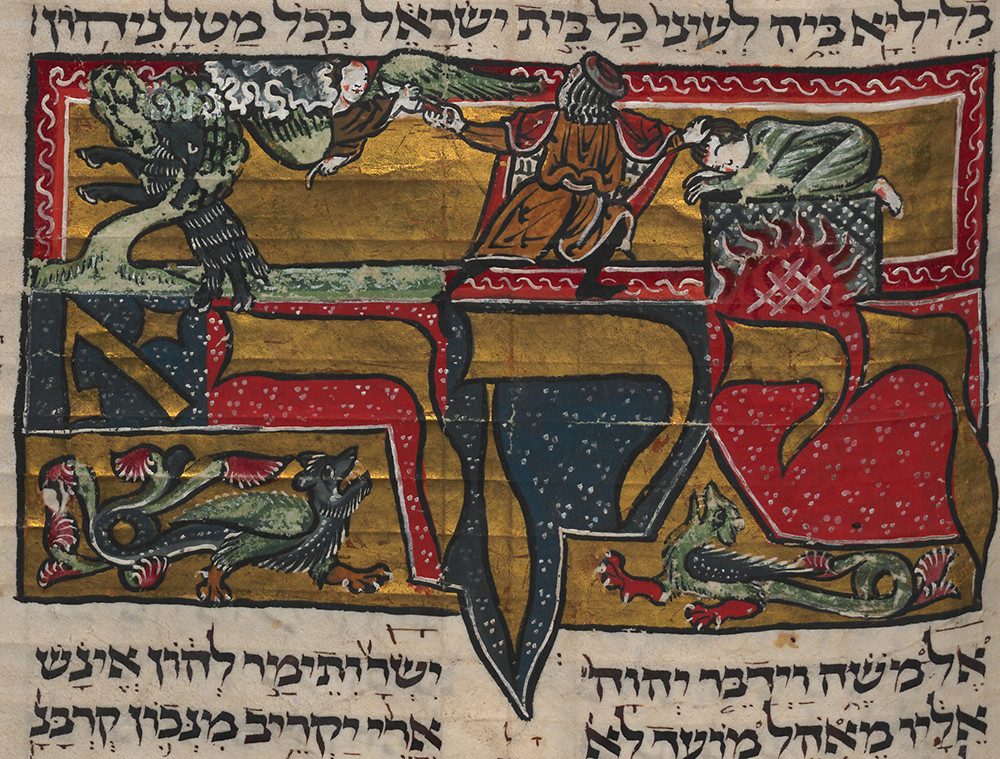
Sacrifice of Isaac, opening of Leviticus, detail of fol. 102r, Ambrosian Tanakh, made in Germany, ca. 1236–38, Biblioteca Ambrosiana

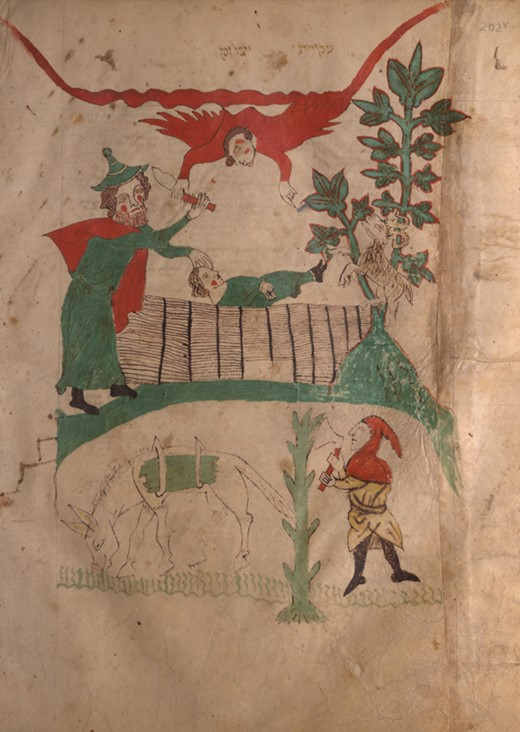
Sacrifice of Isaac, The Hammelburg Mahzor, 1347–48, Hammelburg, Germany. University and State Library Darmstadt.

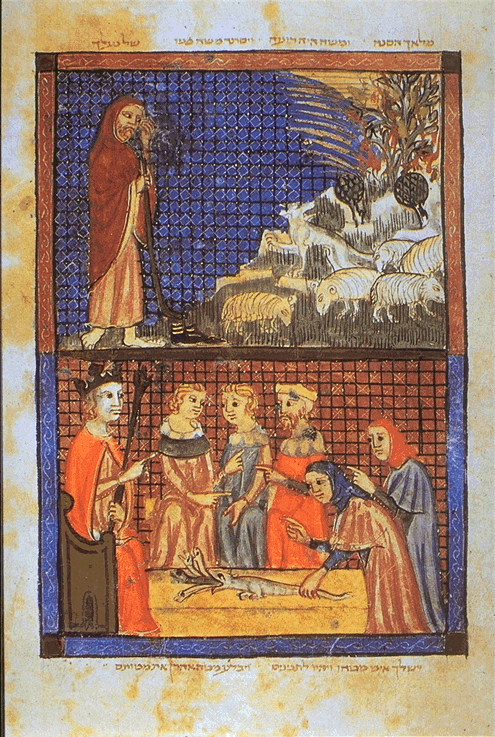
Sarajevo Haggadah, Moses and Burning Bush, top, 15th c. Spain, National Museum of Bosnia and Herzegovina

A number of Jewish illuminated manuscripts include representational art and illustrations, with many containing religious or biblical undertones, while others focus on law, philosophy, science, or society-based (such as ketubbot, marriage contracts) ideas. These manuscripts spanned a wide geographical array, including Europe, Northern Africa, and the East.

Figures such as Joel ben Simeon became known for their work.

Archival records from medieval Iberia confirm that Jews were painters and practitioners of the fine arts. A number of works survive.

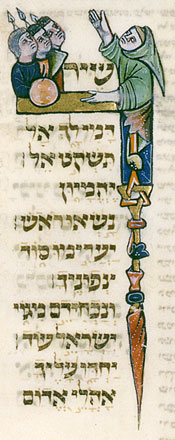
13th c. image from Parma Psalter. The main figure is Asaph, who beseeches: "O God, do not keep silence"

- Bibles
  - Alba Bible
  - Kennicott Bible
  - Schocken Bible
  - Cervera Bible
  - Regensburg Pentateuch
  - Parma Psalter
  - Rothschild Pentateuch
  - Ambrosian Tanakh
  - Lisbon Bible
  - Xanten Bible

Haggadahs

- Barcelona Haggadah
- Golden Haggadah
- Washington Haggadah
- Sarajevo Haggadah
- Ashkenazi Haggadah
- Hispano-Moresque Haggadah
- Graziano Haggadah
- Birds' Head Haggadah
- Kaufmann Haggadah
- Sassoon Haggadah
- Sister Haggadah
- Prague Haggadah
- Rylands Haggadah
- 1739 Joseph ben David Haggadah
- Rothschild Haggadah
- Hamburg Haggadah
- Mahzorim and Siddurim
  - Hammelburg Mahzor
  - Leipzig Mahzor
  - Worms Mahzor
  - Montefiore Mainz Mahzor
  - Rothschild Mahzor
  - Tripartite Mahzor
  - Furth Siddur
- Amsterdam Mahzor
- Catalan Mahzor
- Forli Siddur
- Levy Mahzor
- Michael Mahzor
- Hamilton Siddur
- Chronicles, Miscellany, Other Works
  - Chroniques de la Bible
  - North French Hebrew Miscellany
  - Rothschild Miscellany
  - Works of Maimonides, such as Guide to the Perplexed
    - Guide for the Perplexed by Ferrer Bassa 1348
    - Kaufmann Mishneh Torah
    - 1457 - ca. 1465 Mishneh Torah
  - Megillot (ie, Book of Esther or scrolls of Esther)
    - Ferrara book of Esther

== See also ==
- Aniconism in Islam
- Aniconism in Christianity
- Iconoclasm

== Notes ==
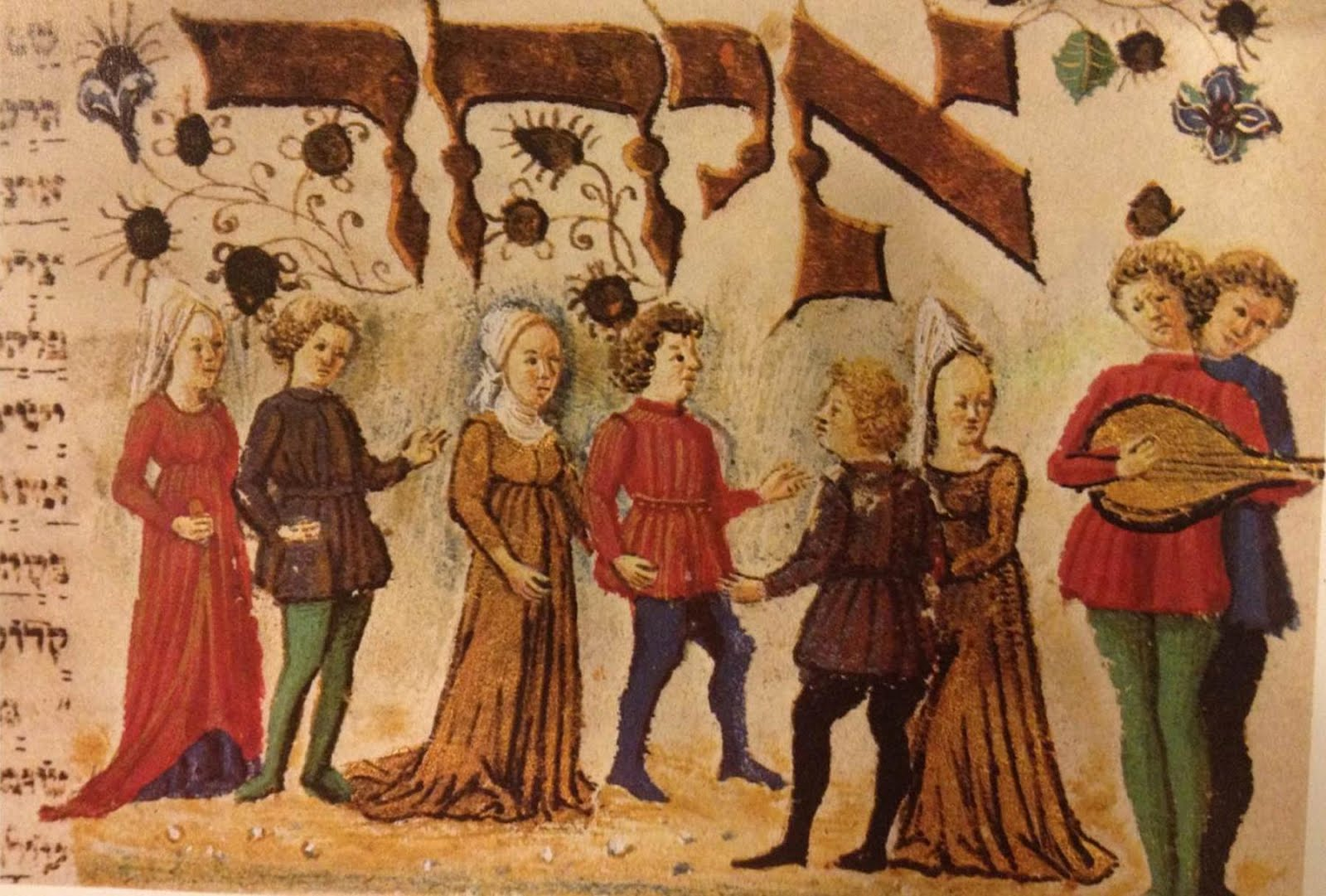
people dancing, Rothschild Miscellany, Mid 15th century
