= Ephraim Deinard =

Hebrew bookman

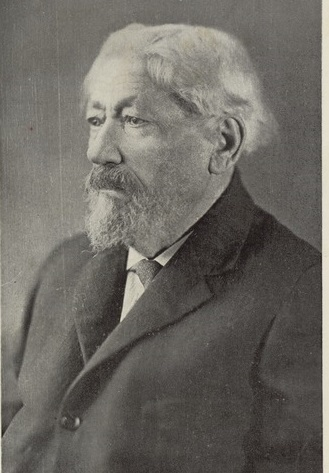

Ephraim Deinard (1846–1930) was a Hebrew bookman. He was a bookseller, bibliographer, publicist, polemicist, historian, memoirist, author, editor, and publisher. He produced some 70 volumes whose subjects range from Jewish history and antiquities (especially of the Crimea, Russia, America, and The Holy Land), to treatises against Hasidism, Christianity, and Communism, parodies, medieval and modern Hebrew literature, Jewish religion, and especially booklore.

Deinard's antiquarian activities, which involved constant travel throughout Europe, the Orient, and America, gave him an acquaintance with scholars, private collectors, fellow booksellers, and libraries. He came into contact and conflict with numerous Hebrew writers and Jewish communal and political figures. His wide-ranging knowledge and experience are fully reflected in his own voluminous writings, mostly in Hebrew, produced over more than half a century. His scope of interests, the intensity of his sentiments, the acerbity of his remarks, all coupled with his bibliophily, render Deinard's works a source of contemporary Jewish historical and literary controversy, as seen in the margins of the Hebrew-reading world, before and after World War I.

== Publisher ==
Devoted to many periods and genres of Hebrew literature, Deinard published, aside from new or revised editions of early polemical tracts, various medieval and modern Hebrew texts, works by American Hebrew authors, and sharp critiques of modern Hebrew writing. Involved in Hebrew journalism since his youth, Deinard made several brief attempts to publish his own journals, including one of the first Hebrew papers in America, and a Zionist Yiddish paper in Newark, New Jersey, of which no copy survives. Deinard did not neglect Yiddish, and in the time he lived in Odessa, he published both Hebrew and Yiddish works by the Podolian-born historian and belletrist M. N. Litinsky. Some Yiddish texts appear in his Hebrew books, and he deals with Yiddish in his catalogs and bibliographies. One of his last books, Devir Efrayim, which was published just after the founding of the Yiddish Scientific Institute (YIVO) in 1925, contains a chapter on Yiddish.

His books were printed in eleven towns in Europe, Ottoman Palestine, and America, including Odessa, Pressburg, Warsaw, Vienna, New York City, Newark, Kearny, Jerusalem, Jaffa, St. Louis and Arlington. In his time Deinard was the most prolific Hebrew author-publisher in New Jersey. At the end of his career, Deinard had sixteen volumes printed at the Moinester Press in St. Louis, more than he had printed in any other town. This press catered almost exclusively to immigrant rabbinic authors from Eastern Europe. Of the books printed in St. Louis, some were "published" in New Orleans, a Hebraist center where he spent his last twelve years.

A number of Deinard's books are bibliophilic curiosities; several were printed in limited editions of 50 or 100 copies, some have survived in only a handful of copies, and one was said to survive in only a single copy. Reviving an old tradition in Hebrew printing, five of his books were printed on colored papers (blue, green, red, yellow, and gold), two of them using a variety of these papers, and one using red ink. Some of his books are unusual in their dimensions: several are very small octavos, and one work, appropriate to Moses. Montefiore is an oversize folio on gold paper. The narrow miniature Zemir `Aritsim on colored papers is known as one of the great oddities of Hebrew booklore. Some books are enhanced with illustrative plates or other reproductions or fold-out leaves. The Kundes, another octavo on multicolored papers, contains cartoons taken from Abraham Goldfaden's first illustrated Yiddish periodical. A few volumes make use of unusual or complex typography.

Following a long tradition of false and fictional imprints in Hebrew publishing, especially in Eastern Europe, one of his books bears the imprint "Sodom" and another "Boltunovka" ("Chatter-town"), although in fact both were printed in Newark, New Jersey. A third rarity, on colored papers, bears the imprint "Tsevu'im" ("the painted capital of hypocrites"), "at the press of the Raziel the angel". Deinard's eccentric and combative personality is reflected in another textual-bibliographic idiosyncrasy: he is known to have printed special copies for specific individuals, with variant texts depending on the intended recipient, some copies differing considerably from each other.

== Polemics and parodies ==
Deinard is remembered today as both a bookman and a prolific polemicist, two careers inextricably linked in his singular personality. Indeed, his works are devoted in large part to religious, political, and even bibliographical polemics. He attacked Hasidism and Christianity in equal measure, with plenty of bile left over for Communism, Reform Judaism, Kabbalah, Jewish apostates, and Karaism. Deinard reissued several early anti-Hasidic works, including two tracts of diverse authorship entitled Zemir 'Aritsim, as well as his own Hebrew translation of Israel Ubel's German diatribe. He edited another polemical text preserved in manuscript in the Bodleian Library (one of several Oxford manuscripts edited by Deinard), and printed a previously unpublished anti-Hasidic work by the Russian maskil Isaac Baer Levinsohn. His two-volume Alatah, which is of bibliographic interest, attempts to show the Zohar to be a forgery, and that Hasidism is Catholicism in disguise. Deinhard was also a critic of the early Hasidic historiographer Michael Levi Rodkinson.

After Hasidism, Deinard's biggest bugaboo was Christianity. Over the course of 40 years, he published seven volumes of anti-Christian polemics, beginning with his first book in America, an edition of medieval Judeo–Christian disputations. He later reissued Hasdai Crescas' 14th-century refutation of Christian beliefs, though his accompanying edition of an 18th-century anti-Christian polemic by David Nassy of Surinam was destroyed by fire. Deinard wrote several attacks on the Jewish biography of Jesus by Joseph Klausner, and his last printed book, A Zoo Without an Animal, questioned the existence of Jesus. Several of his books contain essays directed against Jewish converts to Christianity, among them the ill-fated antiquarian Moses Wilhelm Shapira, who attempted to sell ancient Biblical fragments of questionable authenticity to the British Museum.

Deinard's particular literary gifts are displayed in his Kundes ("Prankster") and Ployderzak ("Chatterbox"), written in the tradition and style of earlier maskilic or anti-Hasidic parodies. The latter, with its Yiddish title, mocks the flawed Jewish journalism of his day. These works are among the earliest of a whole genre of Hebrew parodies written in America shortly before and after 1900.

== Zionism ==
A passionate Hebraist and Zionist, Deinard observed and participated in Jewish national activities on three continents. He devoted a number of books to the Holy Land, Zionism and related subjects, especially the Jewish national movements in Russia, Europe, and America. His narratives of trips to Ottoman Palestine, Syria, Egypt, and every corner of Europe, focus on contemporary Jewish communities and their political affairs. Some of his earliest books, which were published in Pressburg, before his emigration to America in 1888, deal with Jewish aliyah. Some of his last books include an account of Ottoman rule in Palestine, a critique of British policy, and a critical biography of the Anglo-Jewish Maecenas and proto-Zionist Sir Moses Montefiore. While living in Palestine before the end of Ottoman rule, Deinard published texts and documents from manuscripts and old printed books, among them an account of anti-Jewish riots in Ancona, Italy, in the late 18th century. He also published S. Raffaeli's illustrated survey of ancient Hebrew coins, the first Hebrew book on this subject.

== Kohelet Amerika ==
His most well known book is the two-volume Kohelet Amerika, which records books of American Hebrew literature issued from 1735 to 1926. He was the first to devote attention to Hebrew books printed overseas by American authors. Yosef Goldman's Hebrew Printing in America is set around this book. (Indeed, some have taken to calling Goldman "Deinard Junior" for their supposed over-all similarities.)

He also dealt with early Hebrew printing, recording post-incunabula, especially Italian, in 'Atikot Yehudah, and he wrote about the history of Hebrew bibliography and of Hebrew printing, especially in Eastern Europe. The prospectus of Deinard's last library, subsequently acquired by Harvard, also contains a listing of ceremonial Judaica which passed to the Smithsonian.

== Libraries with Deinard ==
Surviving copies of Deinard's many works are scattered in libraries around the globe. No library holds a complete set, and some of his books are exceedingly rare. The largest and most comprehensive collection of Deinard works is said to be in the Yosef Goldman Collection, in New York. A further almost complete collection of Deinard's works, as well as a number of extremely rare works written against him by various literary enemies, is apparently to be found in the Pini Dunner private collection in Los Angeles. The Hebrew Union College libraries in Cincinnati and Los Angeles, the Library of Congress in Washington, D.C., the Jewish Theological Seminary in New York City, and the Harvard University Library (which received donations of Deinard's texts from Lucius Nathan Littauer, housed in Widener and Houghton libraries) also have large collections of Deinard works.

Deinard supplied most of what became the Smithsonian Institution's Judaica holdings. The Smithsonian first purchased a Torah case and sukkah ornaments from him in 1902; between 1920 and 1927 he deposited almost 600 additional objects, which his heirs donated in 1955.

== See also ==
- Washington Haggadah
