= Leipzig Mahzor =

14th-century Jewish prayerbook

The Leipzig Mahzor (from a Jewish machzor), is a 14th-century illuminated manuscript containing the liturgy for Jewish holidays. It is among the most famous medieval Jewish manuscripts, known for its especially lavish illustrations. The large, two-volume set contains poems, known as piyyutim, beyond the prayers that are required for each holiday. This suggests that the machzor would have been used by the cantor of the congregation, who could then choose which piyyutim to include in the service. The manuscript is believed to have been written between 1310 and 1320 in southwest Germany, in or near Worms, then a major center of Jewish life.

The Leipzig Mahzor is one of few machzorim that survived the pogroms of the mid-1300s, when conspiracies that Jews were spreading the Black Plague gave pretense for frightened Europeans to attack Jewish communities and destroy their property. The manuscript is believed to have remained in Worms until the 16th century, when worsening conditions drove much of the Jewish community to emigrate eastward. Annotations and inserted pages indicate that it was taken to Eastern Galicia. It was acquired by Leipzig University in 1746.

In addition to commonly depicted scenes, the Leipzig Mahzor contains less common illustrations from midrashim. These selections show the influence of Rabbi Eleazar of Worms, one of the foremost rabbis of this period and a leader of the mystical Hasidei Ashkenaz movement. In keeping with the mystical tradition of the time, the machzor contains references to and illustrations of the zodiac signs. The less commonly depicted scenes, having no conventional representation, borrow from Christian iconography. Particularly unique to this volume is the depiction of a local custom, the rites performed to introduce a child to Jewish learning. This illustration, showing a rabbi holding a baby and a tablet with Torah verses on it, appears to have been influenced by contemporary depictions of Madonna and child.

== Artistic influences ==
During the Middle Ages, it was common for Jewish manuscripts to depict some or all human beings with the heads of animals. This was likely due to the contemporary interpretation of the prohibition of graven images, though it was not universally applied; some use the animal heads to distinguish men from women, Jews from gentiles, or to set apart especially holy figures. In the Leipzig Mahzor, all humans are depicted with eagle-like beaks.

== Gallery ==
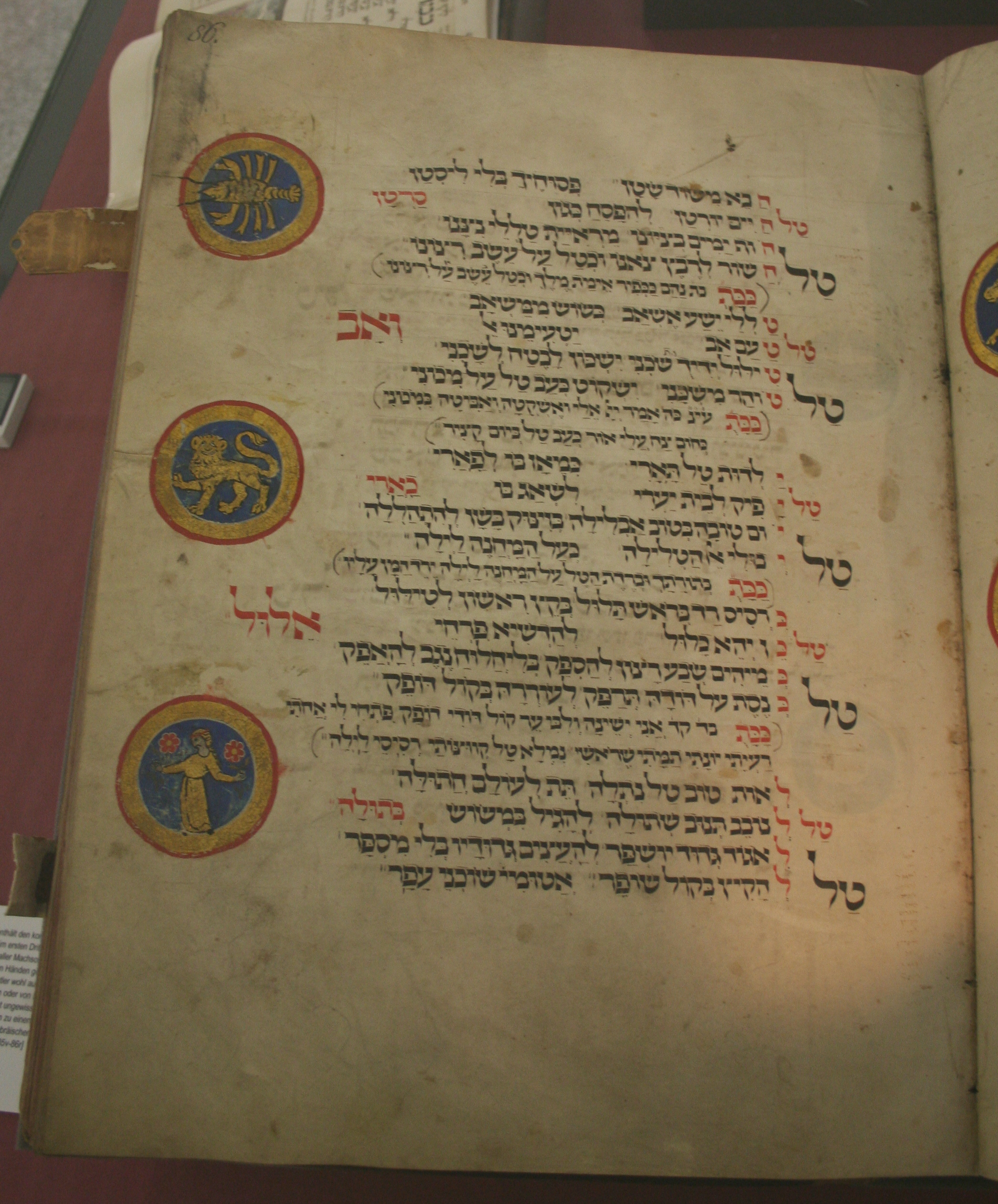
Piyyut containing zodiac imagery

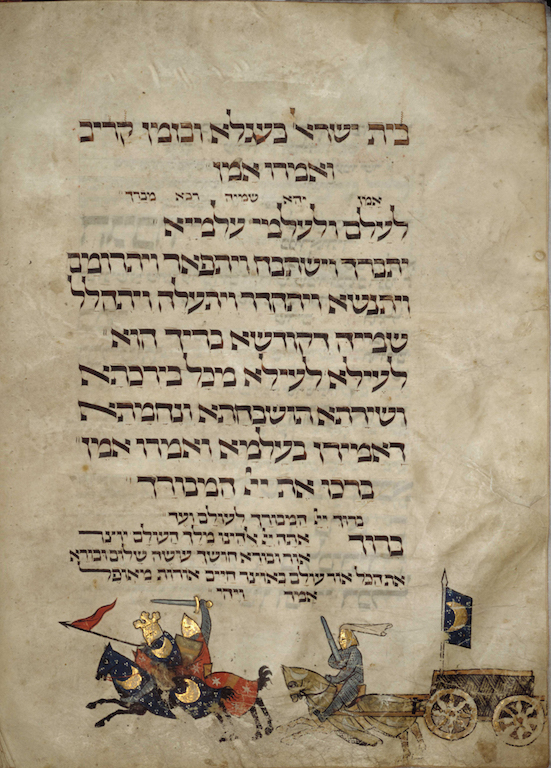
Page from the section on the passover

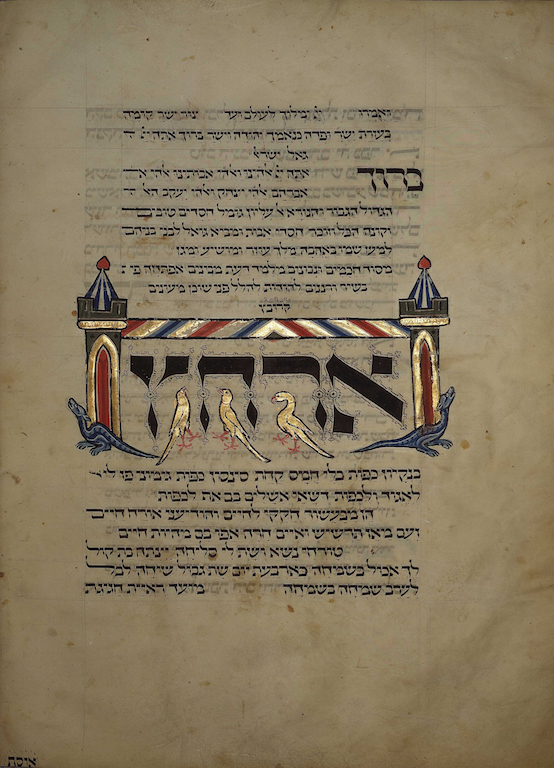
Prayer for the first day of Sukkot

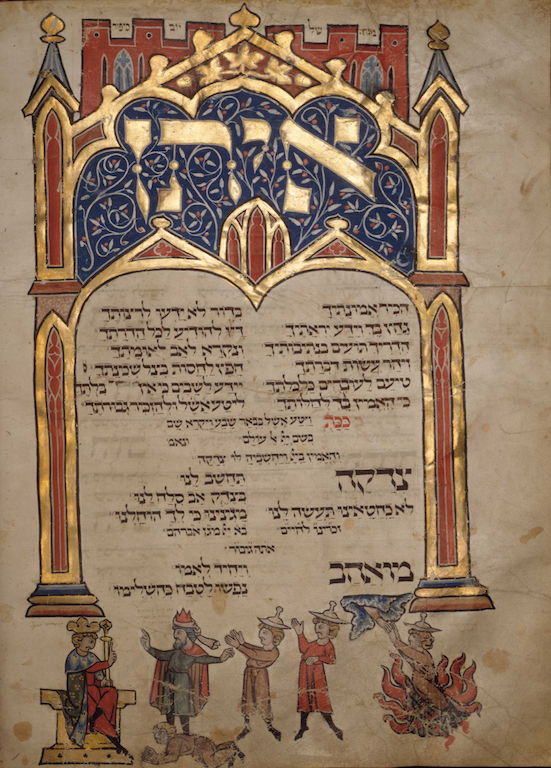
Yom Kippur evening service, depicting the hand of God delivering Moses.

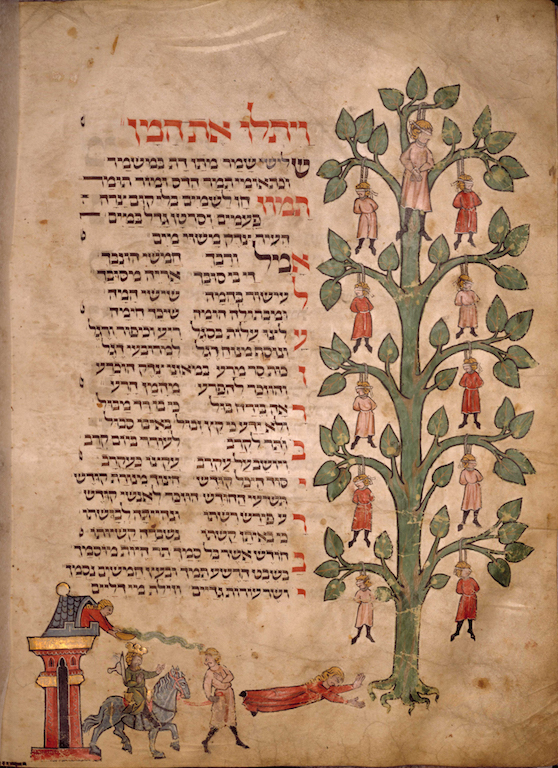
A page of the Leipzig Mahzor

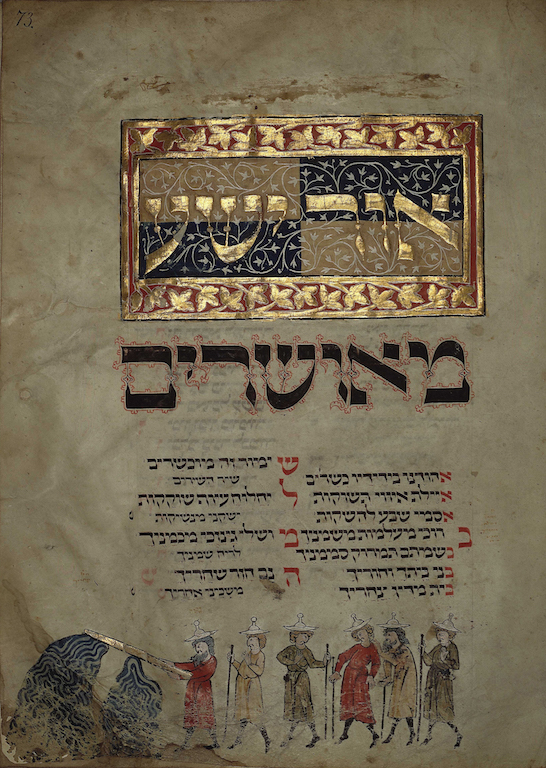
A page of the Leipzig Mahzor

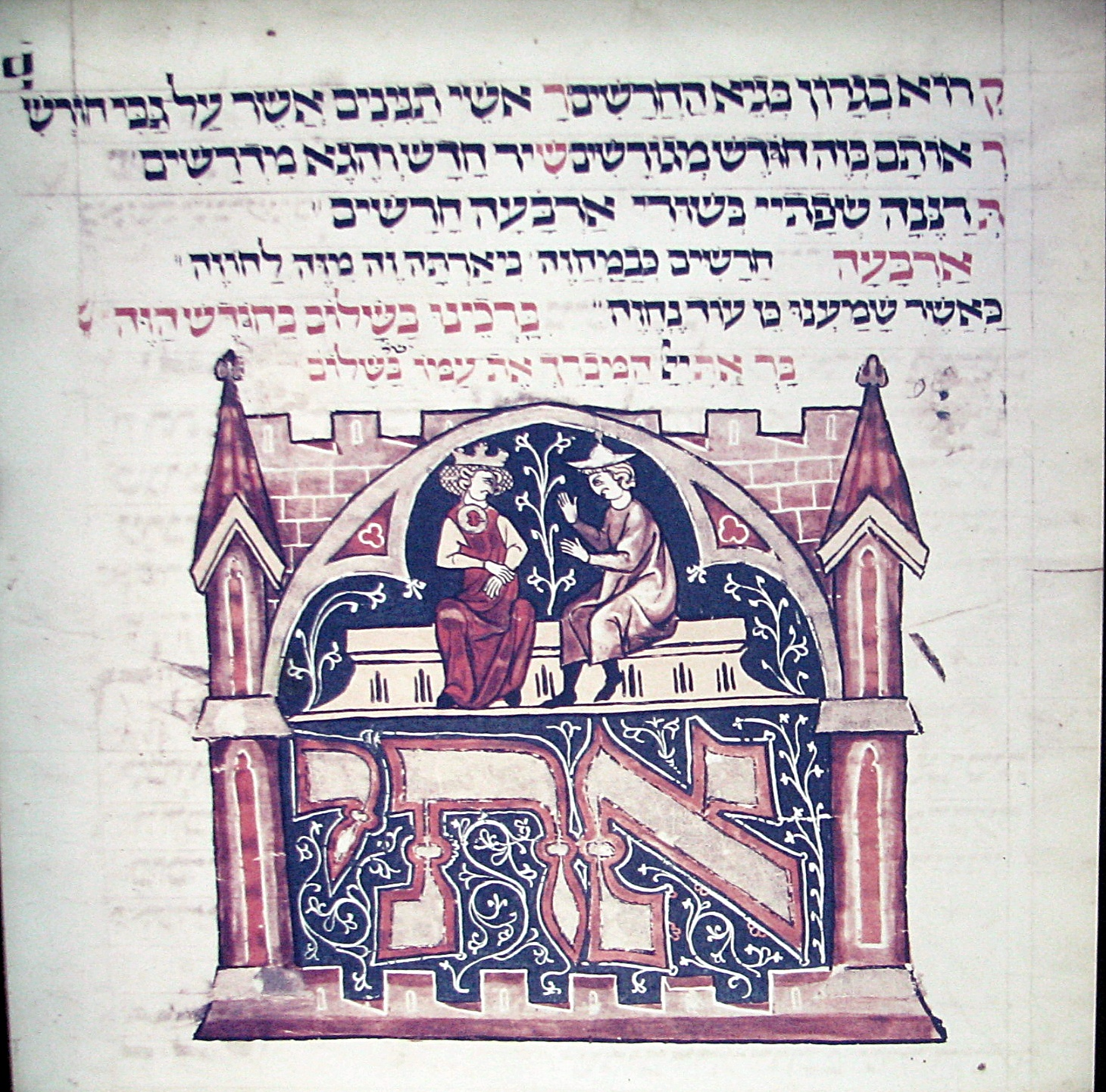
A page depicting a bride and groom

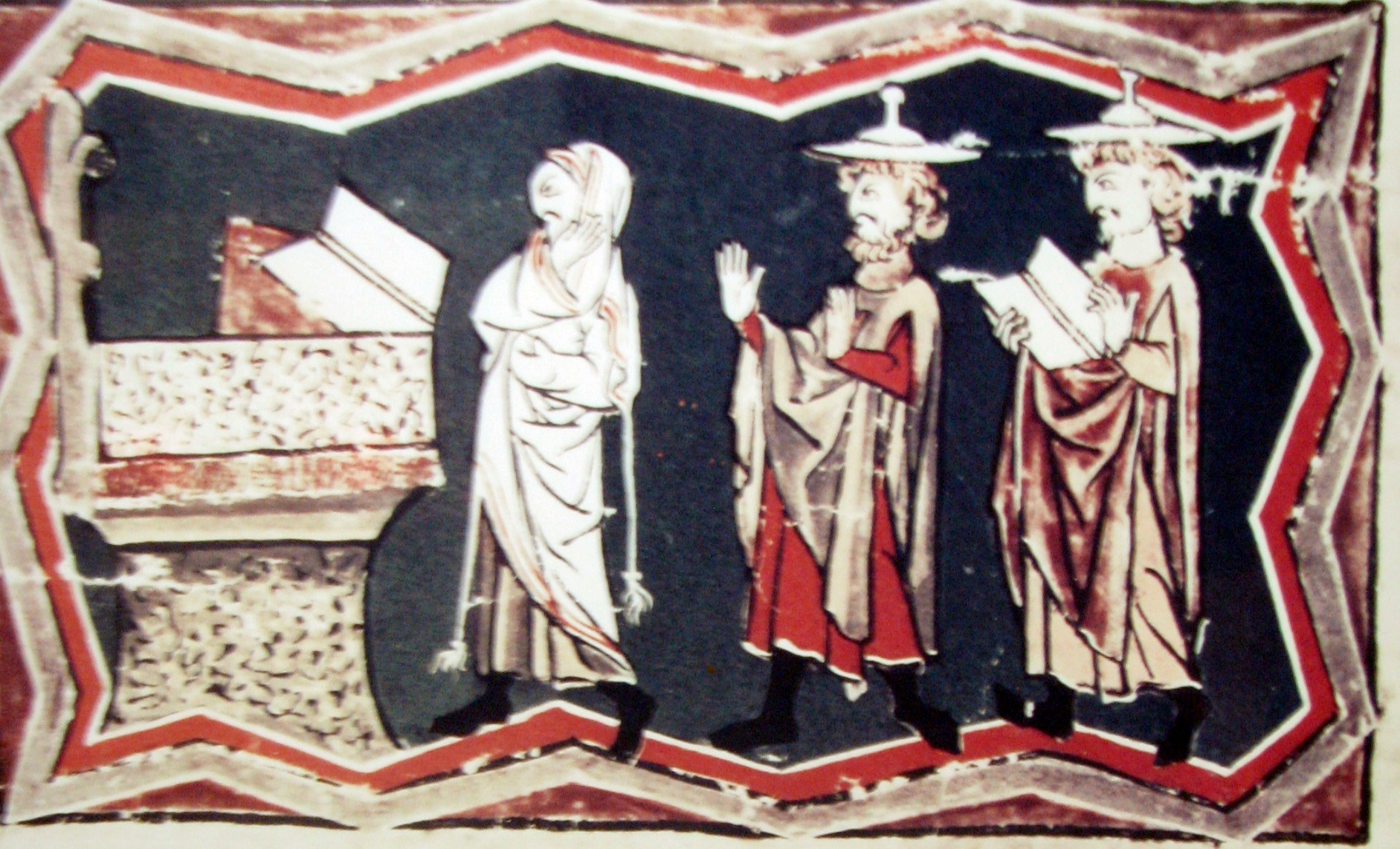
An illustration of men praying

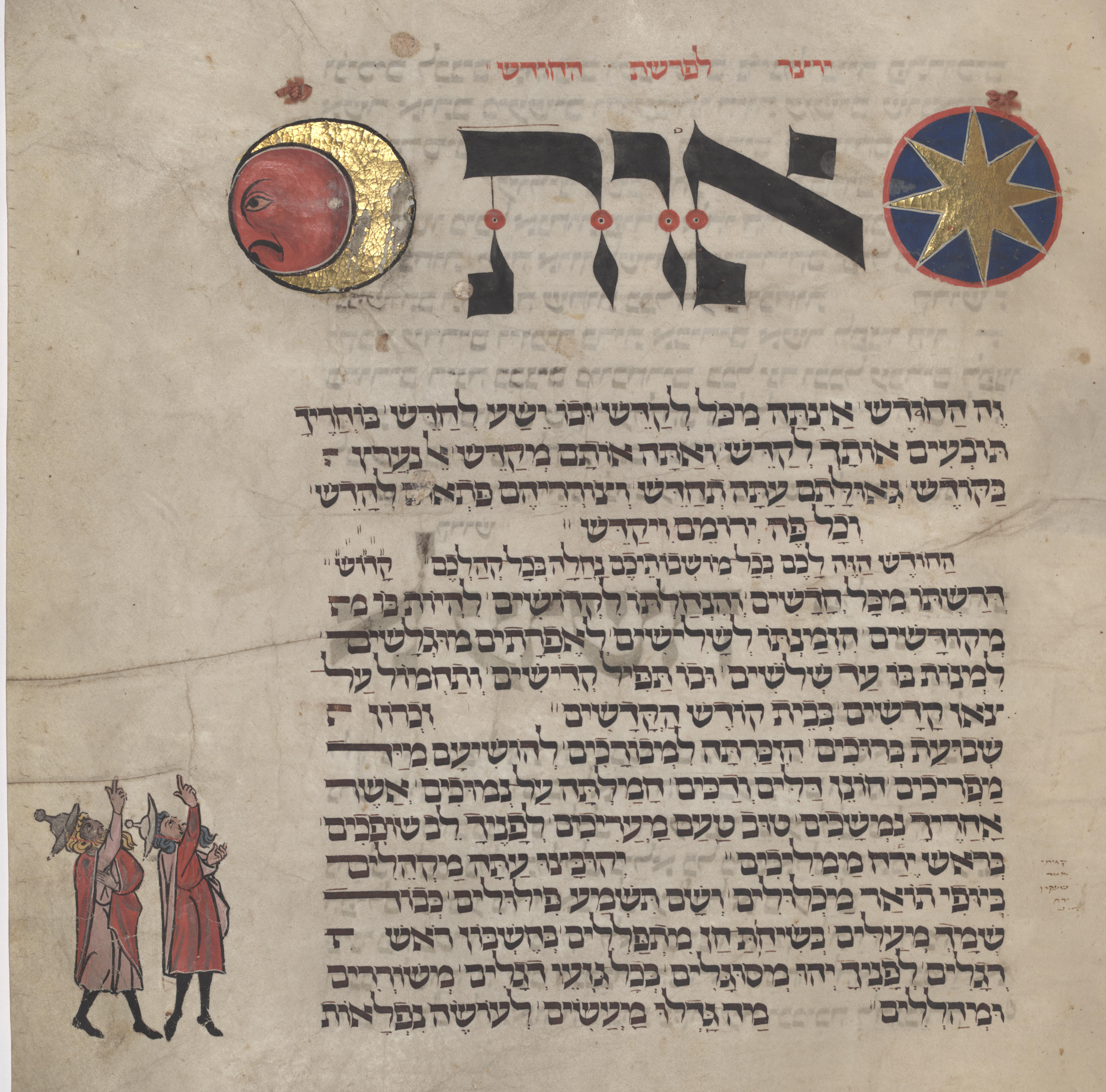
The piyyut "Sign of this Month," depicting men observing the moon

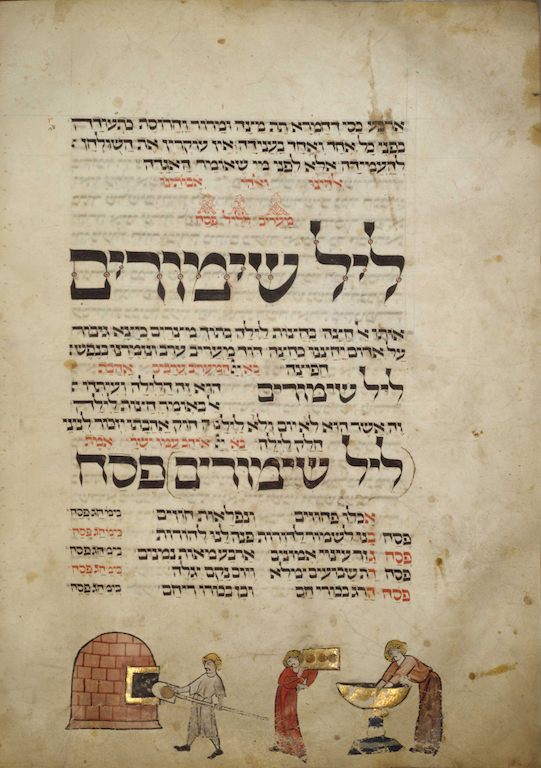
The baking of unleavened bread for Passover

== See also ==
- Jewish holidays
- Jewish prayer
