= Washington Haggadah =

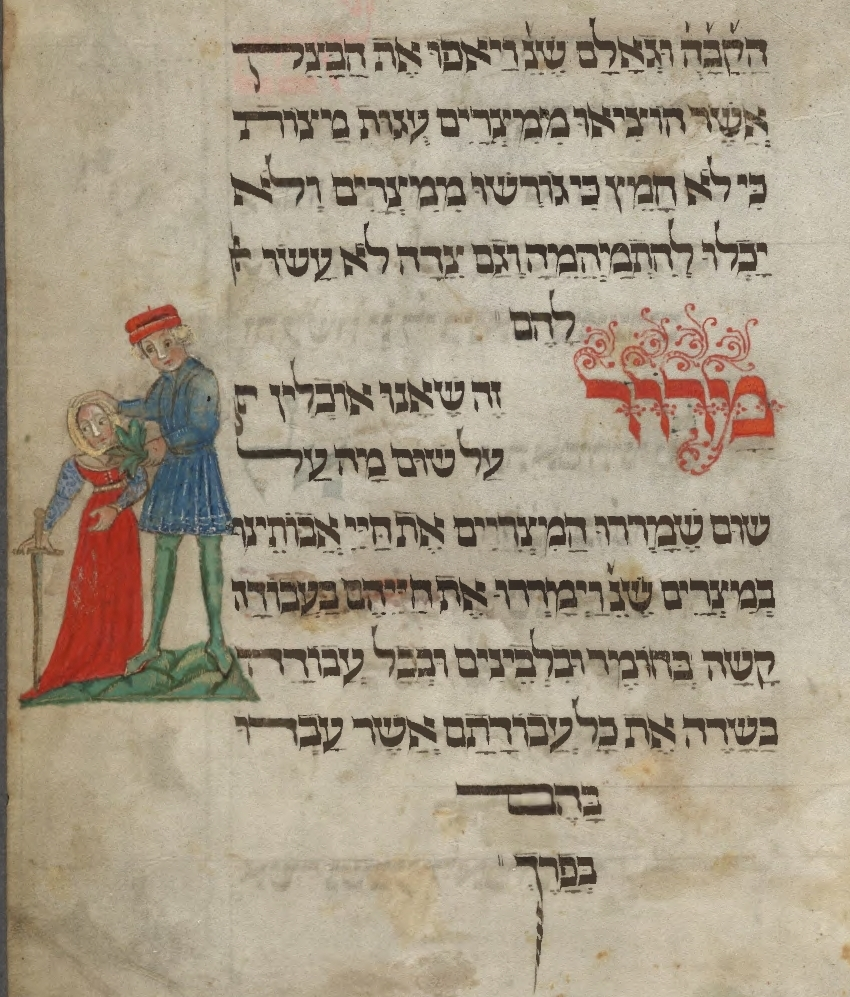
- Folio 16a from the Washington Haggadah. There is a custom that a man points to his wife when mentioning maror based upon the verse Ecclesiastes 7:26 “Now I find woman more bitter than death.”
- Artist: Joel Ben Simeon
- Year: January 29, 1478
- Medium: Parchment

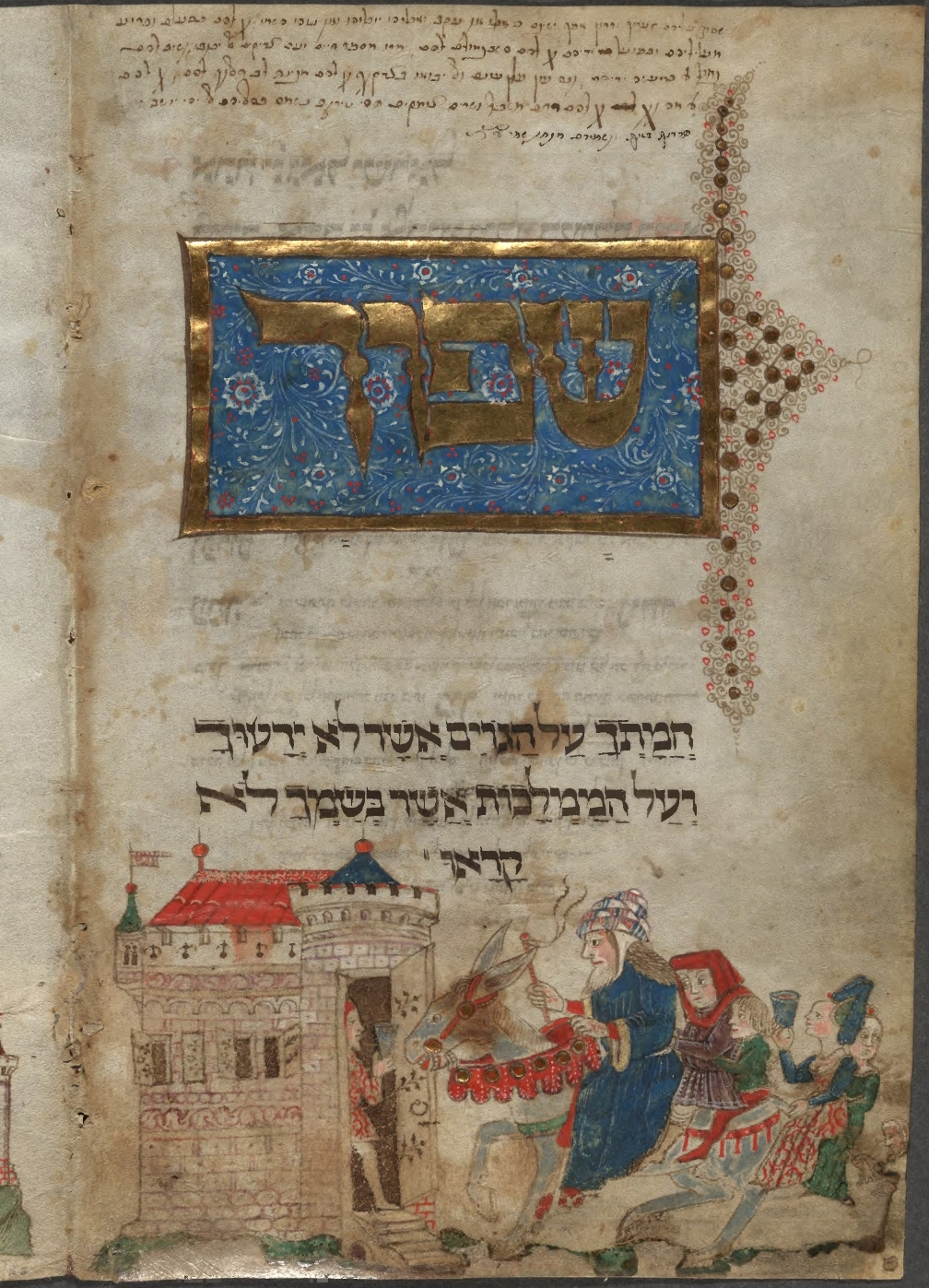
This image shows the Messiah and Elijah riding a donkey and arriving at the home of a Jew.

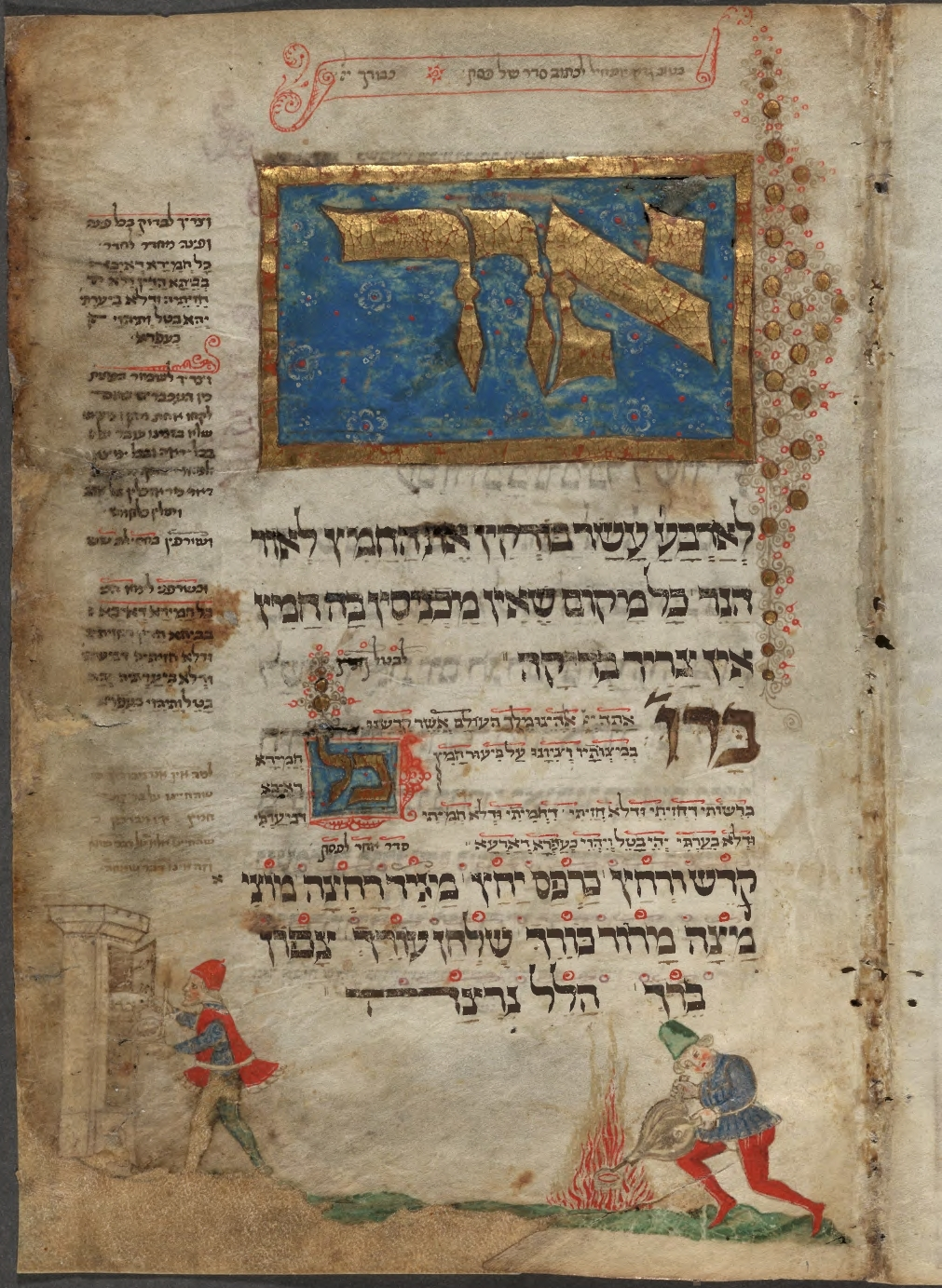

The Washington Haggadah (Hebrew: הגדת וושינגטון) is a Hebrew-language illuminated manuscript haggadah created by Joel ben Simeon in 1478. He was a specialist illuminator of haggadot, who seems to have worked in both Italy and Germany, and whose style shows influences from the contemporary art of both countries. It is significant as it shows the vibrancy of Jewish art during the medieval period, scenes of daily life, and also highlights positive interfaith relations between Christians and Jews.

The book was given to the United States Library of Congress in 1916 by Ephraim Deinard as part of the Third Deinard Collection. Originally referred to as Hebraic Manuscript #1, it has since been referred to as the Washington Haggadah in honor of the city. In 2011, the haggadah was on display at the Metropolitan Museum of Art in New York for some months.

== Description ==
The Haggadah is 6” x 9” and composed of parchment. The motifs illustrated are typical of medieval haggadot and show various scenes of the Passover tradition. However, there are stylistic conventions which hint towards the Haggadah’s unique cross-cultural origins, such as headwear worn by some characters which are distinctly Italian like the red capitanesca hat. Additionally, some initial words are enveloped by gold fruits, assumed to be golden oranges, which are motifs commonly found in Italian-Jewish manuscript illumination. While it was common in medieval manuscripts to decorate the initial letters, medieval haggadot often included the decorations around the entire word itself. The style of script has been described as Ashkenazic square script. It is noted that there is no patron in the colophon and pages were left blank at the end, so this work was likely made in advance to sell to a later buyer who might have had particular requests. M. Glatzer argues that while Joel was indeed the painter of the Haggadah's art, he was not in fact its scribe. Glatzer points out that Joel ben Simeon's colophon names himself as the work's painter, not its scribe.

The Haggadah’s illuminations overall convey a secular tone. The entire story of the Exodus of the Israelites from Egypt is not included, and most illuminated scenes reflect contemporary surroundings rather than biblical storytelling—in fact, only two biblical stories are shown: the coming of Elijah and a depiction of Daniel. This secular focus was uncommon for Ashkenazi Jews during the medieval period. These charming scenes showing family life and Seder rituals might have been influenced by contemporary Italian or Sephardic works that Joel ben Simeon might have come into contact with during his time in Italy.

== Contents ==
Folio 1a depicts a scene common in haggadot to this very day: a scene of the father removing the matzot. F.4a shows again the father of the family with two goblets of wine, one for himself and one for the Prophet Elijah, who is believed to arrive during the Seder dinner. Fs. 5b and 6a depict the archetypal four children: wise, wicked, simple, and silent. The wise son studies a book upon his desk, while the wicked son clutches a sword. The simple son sits as a student does and wears simple clothing, while still the silent son is shown as a clown.

F. 7b illustrates a man with a javelin across his shoulder and a satchel at his belt whose identity is believed to be Laban. Fs. 14b, 15b, and 16a show rare glimpses into medieval Jewish life mixed into scenes pertaining to the Passover lamb, matzah, and maror, respectively. While a man spins the lamb over a gridiron, a couple of women chat while cooking and a dog is shown to be licking his teeth in hungry anticipation. Interestingly, the matzot are being offered by an ape seated upon a pillow. The scene coinciding with maror, the bitter herbs used during the Passover ceremony, includes an illustration of a man pointing to a woman holding a sword, jesting and comparing her to the bitter herb, with the sword indicating that women are sharp as a double-edged sword.

Further into the manuscript, F.17a depicts a man with a goblet in both his hands while F.19b shows an old man with a white beard seated on a donkey being approached by the man in F.17a. The man, with his wife, son, and daughter, climb atop the donkey and take their seats, with the smallest child being pulled along by the animal's tail. This is an uncommon imagining of the scene for Elijah to physically be present. Instead, many haggadot—contemporary as well as modern—choose to show this scene with the door of the house being left open for Elijah's imminent arrival, this folio instead includes an illustration of Elijah himself.

Some scenes have been understood to carry more esoteric interpretations. For example, F.22a illustrates a city with towers and walls along with an enfeebled prisoner. Landsberger writes that the meaning of this scene is found in Psalm 118:5, where he writes that the term "straits" in the verse refers instead to literal walls rather than personal woes. Additionally, F.30a shows a suppliant knelt in the den of a lion who is believed to be Daniel, and this is the final image in the cycle of illustrations.

== History ==
Like many medieval Jewish scribes, Joel ben Simeon was an itinerant worker in search of patrons. His travels took him throughout medieval Europe, where he spent much of his time in Italy and in Germany where he was born. Various bans on Jewish populations similarly contributed to his frequent travels. Consequently, he developed a uniquely Italian-Ashkenazi style within his illuminations. It is believed that although Joel initially illuminated the Washington Haggadah, it was likely a collaboration between Joel and Christian German artists. Yael Zirlin describes the Haggadah as being a shared effort between Joel and the workshop artists of the German artist Johannes Bämler. Evidence of interfaith professional partnerships within the medieval period is scant, yet instances are found in works like the Washington Haggadah. Jewish artists such as Joel ben Simeon would work alongside their Christian counterparts, often aiding in instruction for the illustration of Hebrew characters which were unfamiliar to Christian artists accustomed to using Latin. Stylistically, the German parts of the haggadah are completely dissimilar to the Italian ones with regard to differences in floral motifs and depictions of figures, with some being far more delicate and some more crude. This is further indicative of a multicultural collaboration across various workshops.

Scribes were often anonymous craftsman, Ben Simeon signed this work of his and included a date. This was perhaps in an effort to compete against the innovations of the printing press which had been invented around twenty years prior. Although no one knows the original patron of the Washington Haggadah, based on writings found on the blank pages it is believed to have been purchased by an Ashkenazi that Joel had encountered somewhere during his travels throughout Germany or Italy. The Haggadah's exact provenance is lost during the eighteenth and nineteenth centuries, but it is known that bibliographer and bookseller Ephraim Deinard obtained the manuscript during a trip to Italy in 1902 before it was later purchased by the Library of Congress in 1916. Deinard's personal contributions added an estimated 20,000 volumes of Judaica to the Library's collections.
