= Joel ben Simeon =

Jewish scribe (??–c.1492)

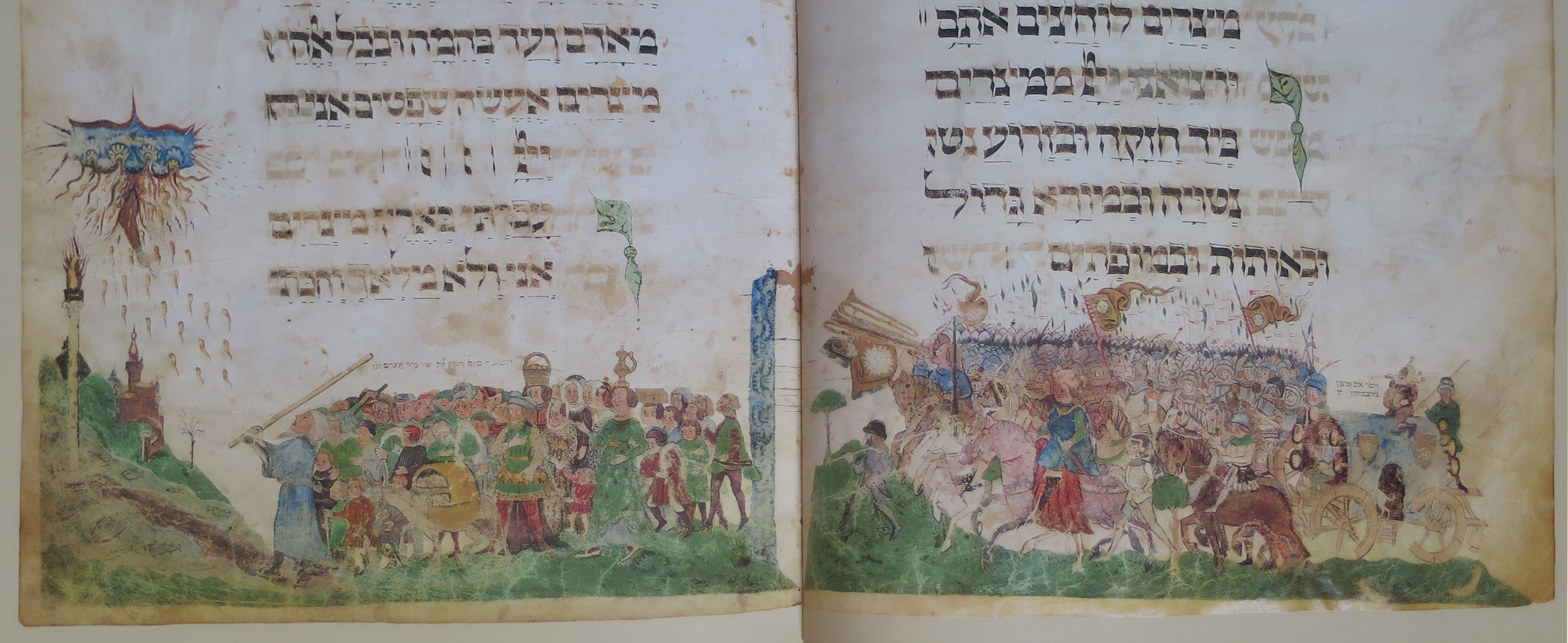

Joel ben Simeon, also known as Feibush Ashkenazi (died c.1492), was a 15th-century Jewish scribe and illuminator who worked in Germany and Northern Italy. He was active from c.1445. He is best known for the manuscript today known as the Ashkenazi Haggadah.

Simeon is among the most famous scribal artists to come from the region of Germany. Migrating to Italy, he brought his native illuminating techniques.

== Life ==
Joel ben Simeon resided in Cologne (where Jews were expelled in 1424) or Bonn. Around the middle of the century he moved to northern Italy, where he travelled between cities to work his trade. He died around 1492.

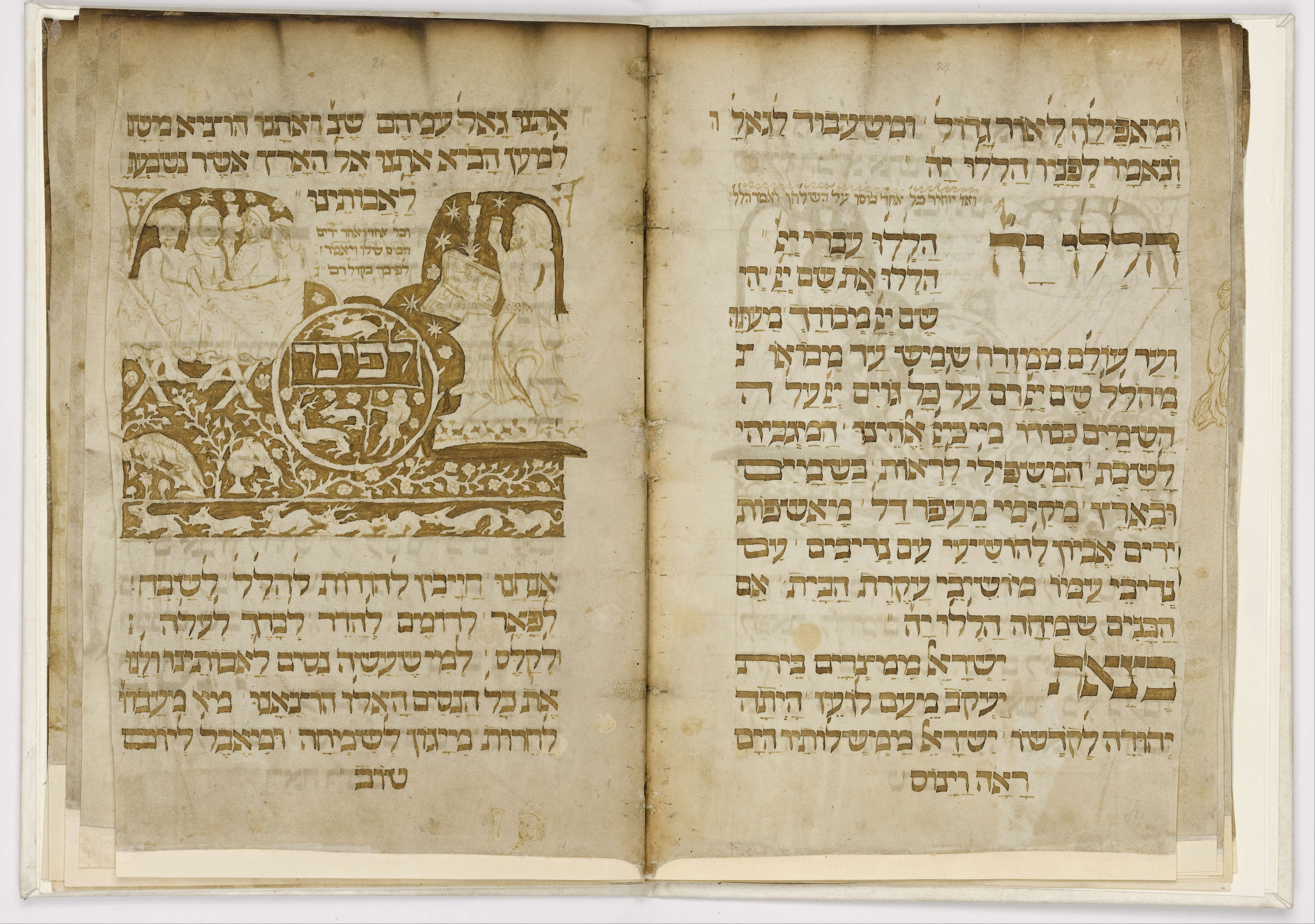
First Nuremberg Haggadah, illuminated by Joel ben Simeon.

== Works ==
- First New York Joel ben Simeon Haggadah
- Second New York Haggadah, (JTS cat. no. 37), 1454
- Ashkenazi Haggadah
- Londoner Haggadah
- Washington Haggadah (LC Hebr. Ms 181), 1478
- First Nuremberg Haggadah
- First Parma Haggadah
- Rothschild Weill Mahzor
- Murphy Haggadah
- Vienna Siddur-SeMaK
- London Ashkenazi Haggadah
- Maraviglia Teffilah, 1469
- Piskei R. Asher ben Yehiel
