= Birds' Head Haggadah =

Illuminated Passover liturgical manuscript

- Israel Museum
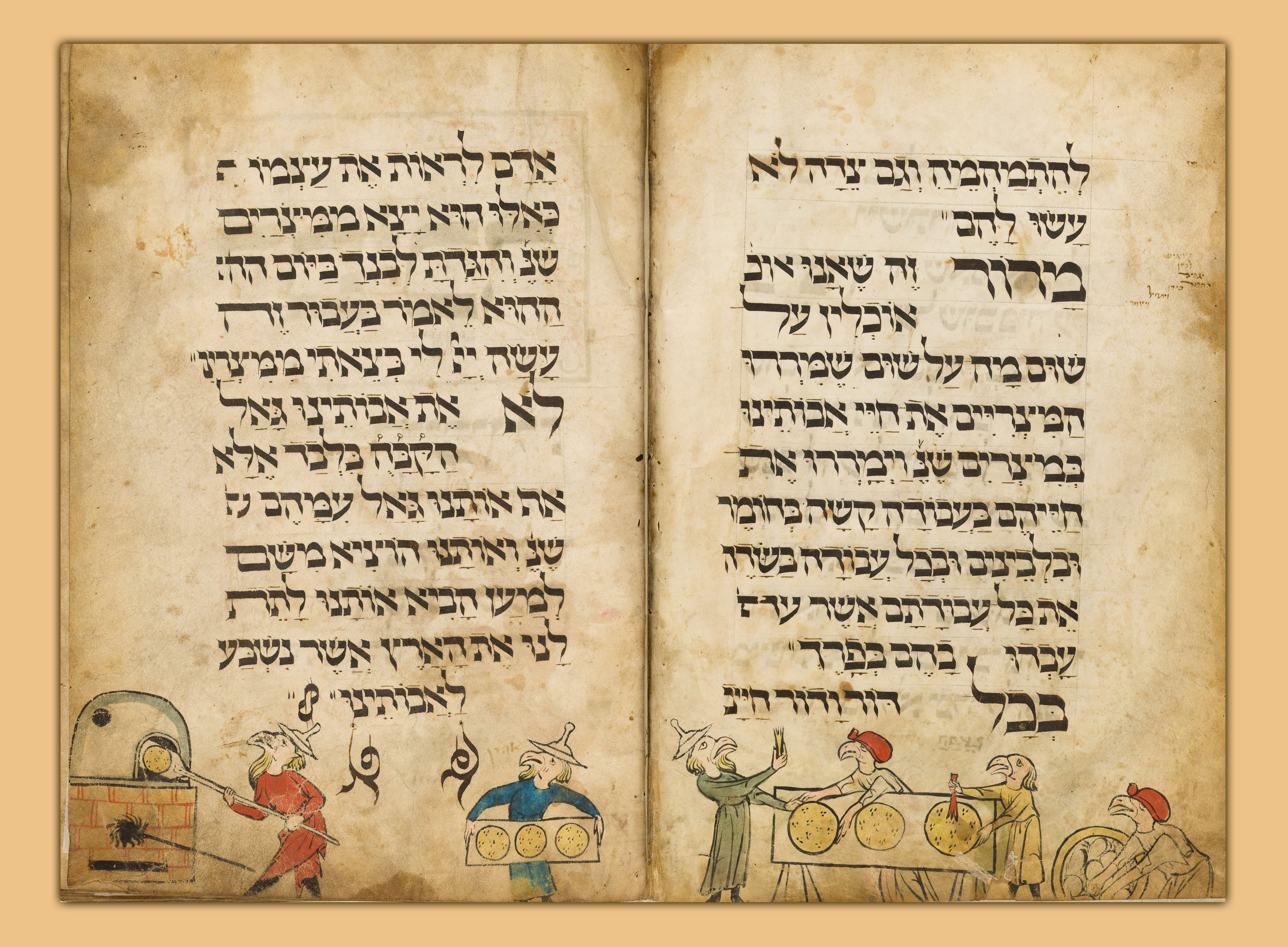
- Manuscript pages showing text of Haggadah with illustrations of bird-headed Jews baking matzo for Passover
- Type: Illuminated manuscript
- Date: c. 1300
- Place of origin: Southern Germany
- Language: Hebrew
- Scribe: Menahem
- Material: Dark brown ink and tempera on parchment
- Size: 27 by 18.2 centimetres (10.6 in × 7.2 in); 50 pages (originally)
- Script: Block calligraphy
- Contents: Haggadah for Passover, with accompanying illustrations
- Previously kept: Owned by Ludwig Marum until 1933
- Discovered: Purchased by Israel Museum in 1946

The Birds' Head Haggadah (c. 1300) is the oldest surviving illuminated manuscript of an Ashkenazi Jewish Haggadah. The manuscript, produced in the Upper Rhine region of Southern Germany in the early 14th century, contains the full Hebrew text of the Haggadah, a ritual text recounting the story of Passover – the liberation of the Israelites from slavery in ancient Egypt – which is recited by participants at a Passover Seder. The text is executed in block calligraphy and accompanied by colorful illustrations of Jews performing the Seder practices and reenacting Jewish historical events.

The Birds' Head Haggadah is so called because all Jewish men, women, and children depicted in the manuscript have human bodies with the faces and beaks of birds. Non-Jewish human faces and non-human faces (such as those of angels, the sun, and the moon) are blank or blurred. Numerous theories have been advanced to explain the unusual iconography, usually tied to Jewish aniconism. The Haggadah is in the possession of the Israel Museum in Jerusalem, where it is on permanent exhibition.

== Description ==
A Haggadah is a ritual Jewish text containing prayers, hymns, Midrashic statements, and commentary on the story of Passover – the liberation of the Israelites from slavery in ancient Egypt – and is recited by participants at a Passover Seder. The Birds' Head is the oldest surviving illuminated manuscript of an Ashkenazi Haggadah, dated to the beginning of the 14th century, Illuminated manuscripts of the Haggadah began appearing in the 13th century, and printed Haggadahs began to be published in the 15th century.

The style and coloring of the figures reflects that of other illuminated manuscripts from the Upper Rhine region of Southern Germany in that era, perhaps from the vicinity of Würzburg, and the architectural backgrounds are sufficiently detailed to date and locate the manuscript. The Birds' Head Haggadah is believed to be the first illustrated Haggadah produced in its own binding, distinct from the Jewish prayer book.

The manuscript measures 27 centimetres (11 in) long by 18.2 centimetres (7.2 in) wide. It is believed to have originally contained about 50 pages, gathered into five bindings of eight pages each and one binding of 10 pages. In its current condition, it contains 47 pages.

=== Text ===
The text was copied by a scribe named Menahem; the letters of his Hebrew name, מנחם, are graphically accentuated in the similarly-spelled Hebrew word מֻנָּחִים (Munahim) in the Haggadah text, revealing his signature. (Note: The passage in which the Hebrew word Munahim ("are placed") appears references the Jew's obligation to recite the Haggadah when the matzo and maror are placed before him.) The scribe Menahem is also credited with copying the Machzor (High Holy Days prayerbook) of Leipzig around the same time; he encoded his name in that illuminated manuscript in a "decorated text panel".

Each page of the Birds' Head Haggadah contains 12 rows of text, copied in block calligraphy. The calligraphy and illustrations were executed in dark brown ink and tempera on parchment.

The extant manuscript shows smaller, densely packed script written in the margins of some pages, detailing instructions for conducting the Seder and fulfilling the laws pertaining to Passover. "Captions" have also been appended to certain illustrations. According to Epstein, these glosses and captions were added by unknown owners of the Haggadah over the centuries.

The Birds' Head Haggadah is the first known source that includes the recitation of the words "Next Year in Jerusalem" at the conclusion of the Passover service.

=== Illustrations ===
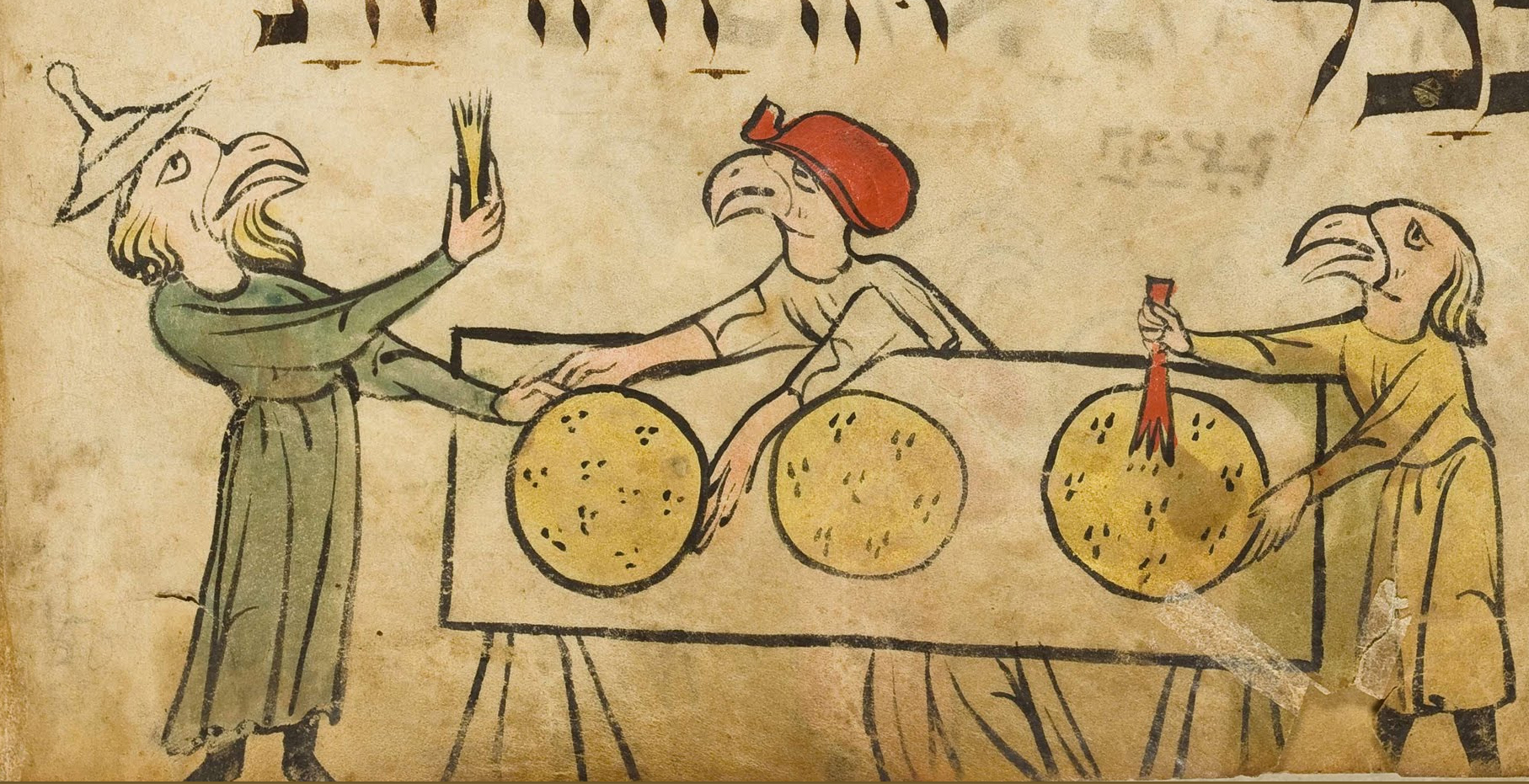
(L. to r.) A Jewish man, woman, and child shape and prick holes in handmade matzos in preparation for baking

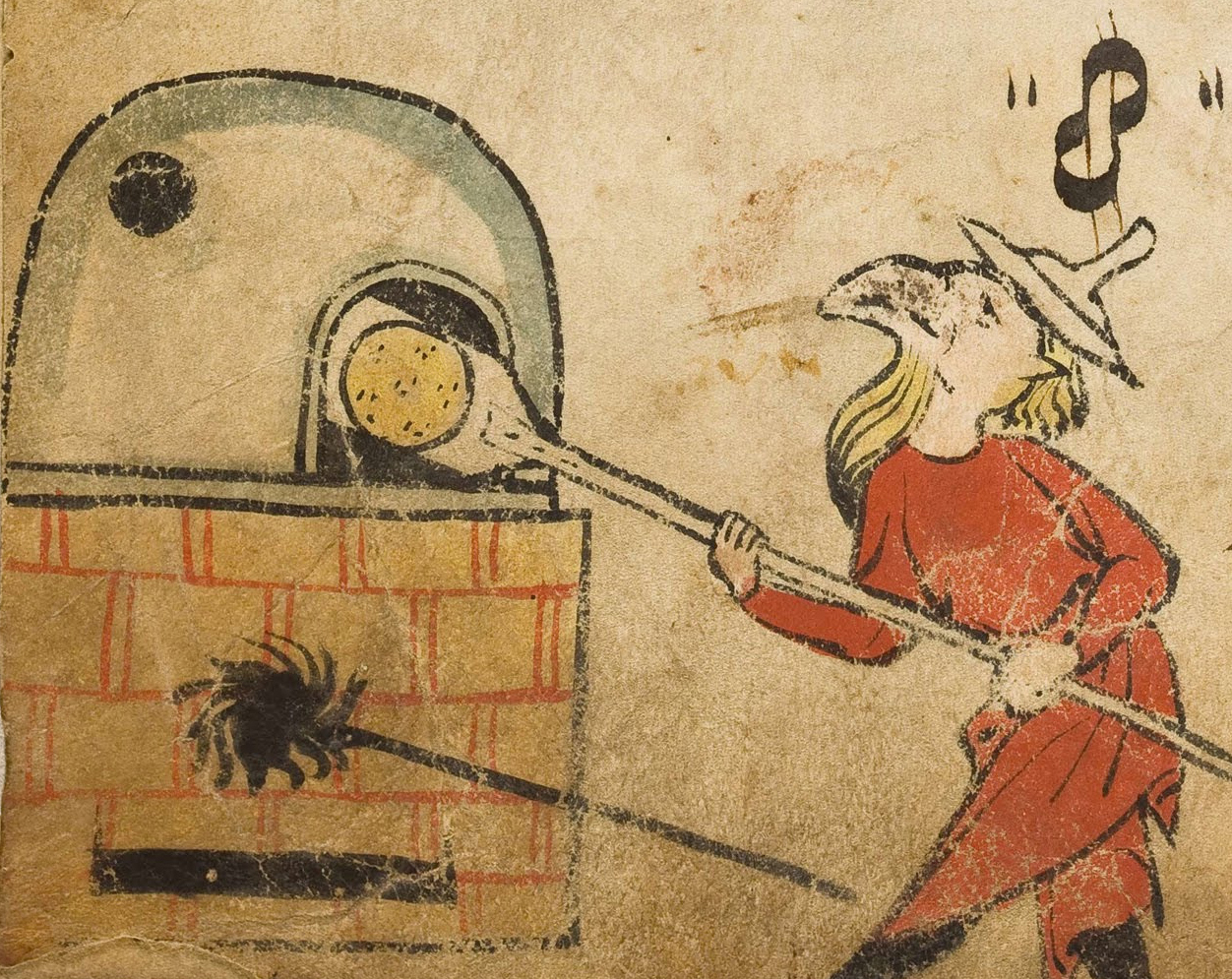
Detail of a bird-headed Jewish man placing matzo in an oven

The manuscript contains two full-page miniatures. The first, placed at the beginning, depicts a husband and wife seated at their Seder table. The second, appearing at the end of the Haggadah, depicts a vision of a rebuilt Jerusalem in the messianic era.

In addition to the full-page miniatures, 33 pages in the manuscript have illustrations in the margins. These illustrations, which closely follow the text, depict Jewish men and women performing Passover and Seder practices, and also reenacting events in Jewish history. The Passover and Seder-themed reenactments include the roasting of the Paschal lamb; the baking of matzos; grinding the bitter herbs; eating the bitter herbs with charoset; leaning on one's left side at the Seder; breaking the middle matzo, and so on. Historical depictions include the Binding of Isaac; the Jewish people hurriedly leaving Egypt with their matzos, which did not have time to rise; Pharaoh and his army pursuing the Jewish nation to the Red Sea; Moses receiving the two Tablets of Stone from heaven and giving over the Pentateuch to the Jewish people; and the Jews receiving manna from heaven during their wanderings in the desert.

The Jewish characters are dressed in medieval German-Jewish clothing, and the pointed "Jewish hat" mandated by the Church beginning in the 13th century is seen on Jewish leaders and teachers, including Moses. Yet while the Jewish characters all have human bodies, and some also have human hair and beards, and wear helmets or women's snoods, their faces are those of "sharp-beaked and sharp-eyed birds". A large beak occupies the place where the nose and mouth should be. Epstein notes that the birds' heads are not uniform, but individualized according to the "age, sex, and status" of the character. Some characters have pigs' ears as well.

The faces of non-Jewish characters, in contrast – such as Pharaoh and the ancient Egyptians – and non-human characters such as angels, the sun, and the moon, are blank or blurred. An unknown artist subsequently added facial features to the Egyptian soldiers, but these additions either faded or were rubbed out.

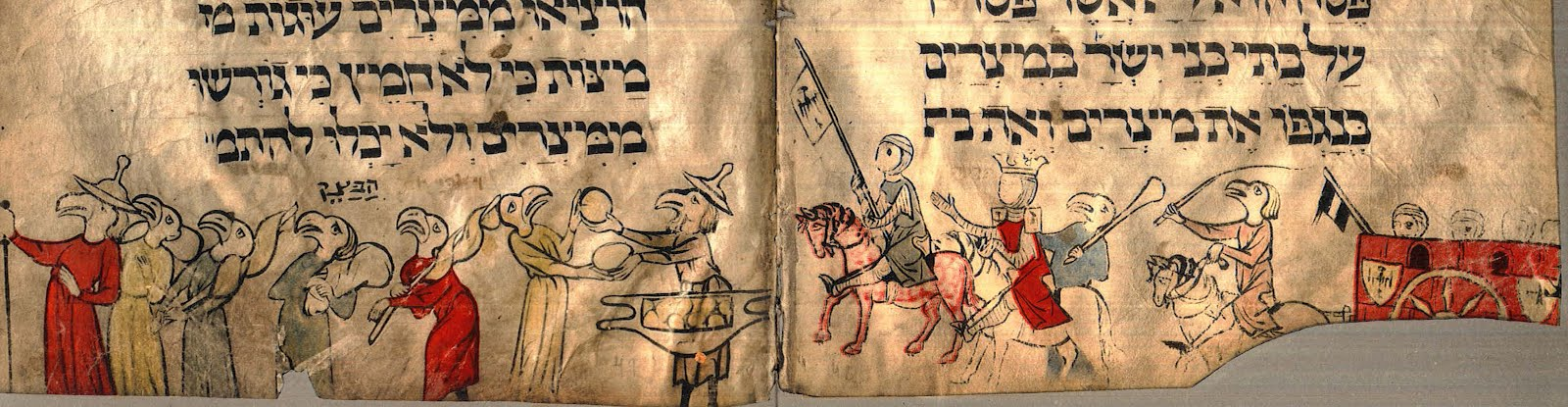
Detail of the Exodus from Egypt: bird-headed Jews bake matzos for the journey and leave Egypt with their possessions (left-hand page); a blank-faced Pharaoh and Egyptian soldiers pursue the Jewish nation (right-hand page)

== Interpretations ==
Within the rather modest field of Jewish visual culture it is, in its own unassuming way, as mysterious as the Pyramids of Giza, the monoliths of Easter Island, or Mona Lisa's smile.

— Marc Michael Epstein on the Birds' Head Haggadah

Numerous theories have been advanced to explain the choice of facial features in the Haggadah's illustrations. A prevalent theory for the use of bird rather than human faces is the illustrator's attempt to circumvent the Jews' Second Commandment's prohibition against making a graven image, in the tradition of Jewish aniconism. Other Ashkenazi Hebrew illuminated manuscripts from the 13th and 14th centuries depict humans with animal heads, known as zoocephalic figures, thought to be in keeping with this prohibition. For example, parts of the Leipzig Machzor, perhaps copied by the same scribe ("Menachim") who copied the Birds' Head Haggadah, feature human heads with somewhat bird-like faces. The fact that some manuscripts contain both human and animal heads casts doubt on these assumptions, and it is not fully understood why zoocephalic figures appear in the haggadah and similar manuscripts. In the Birds' Head Haggadah, the Jewish characters are illustrated with bird heads, while non-Jews have human heads.

Epstein theorizes that the choice of birds' heads for the Jewish figures in the Birds' Head Haggadah hints at the spiritual and national characteristics of the Jewish people. He argues that the beaked visages in the manuscript are not birds' heads at all, but the heads of griffins. The legendary griffin – the body of which resembles both a lion and an eagle – reflects the prevalent use of "lion-eagle-human hybrids" in Jewish iconography. Moreover, the lion-eagle-human hybrid incorporates three of the four creatures represented in Ezekiel's vision of the divine chariot (Ezekiel 1), suggesting a connection between the Jewish people and God. The lion may also allude to the symbol of the tribe of Judah while the eagle evokes the symbol of the German emperor, suggesting the Jews' identification as both subjects of the realm and as Jews. Epstein further theorizes that the blank faces assigned to non-Jewish and non-human figures sends a message to Jewish readers of the Haggadah that these entities have no intrinsic power, but are subject to God's will.

Art historian Meyer Schapiro, who wrote an introduction to the first facsimile edition of the Haggadah published by M. Spitzer in 1965, said that the birds' heads are those of eagles, noting a very similar head on "an unmistakable eagle" in the contemporary Christian Codex Manesse. The Imperial Eagle was the heraldic symbol of the Holy Roman Emperor, under whose protection Jews in Germany lived, which the depiction as eagles may symbolize. In addition, a number of biblical passages can be taken as identifying the Jews with eagles, including Exodus 19:4, especially relevant to the Passover, and Deuteronomy 32:11–12

Carol Zemel said that the birds' heads affixed to Jewish men and women going about their Passover preparations are a tongue-in-cheek allusion to the animal-head gods worshipped by the ancient Egyptians. This connection elevates the spiritual importance of the Jews' work.

Ruth Malinkoff, in her 1999 book Antisemitic Hate Signs in Hebrew: Illuminated Manuscripts from Medieval Germany, said that the appendage of pigs' ears to some Jewish characters clues the reader to the fact that these are antisemitic caricatures instigated by Christian artists. Jewish artists, who were more familiar with the Hebrew text, did the design and copying, and the manuscript was commissioned by Jews as well, but Christian antisemitism heavily influenced the illustrations. This expressed itself in the "stereotypical long noses" and "large eyes", the pigs' ears, and the conical hat worn by many Jewish figures. The fact that the birds' heads themselves are those of birds of prey – which are ritually impure according to Jewish law – also point to the antisemitic undertones of the manuscript, according to Malinkoff.

Meyer Schapiro said the artists were Jewish, trained in the contemporary Gothic idiom, and confident in their style, and "not in the forefront" of contemporary artists; the manuscript "now so exceptional, was in its day a piece of local everyday art". Epstein also challenges Malinkoff's assertion that an antisemitic manuscript would be accepted by its Jewish patrons. He said:

Instead, it makes more sense to assume that the griffins' heads were the specific choice of the patrons. Far from being anti-Jewish caricatures, the griffin-headed figures in the Birds' Head Haggadah are dignified portrayals of Jews, full of character and personality. All are going seriously about their business or are posed with stateliness and monumentality in spite of the singular strangeness of their heads.

== Provenance ==
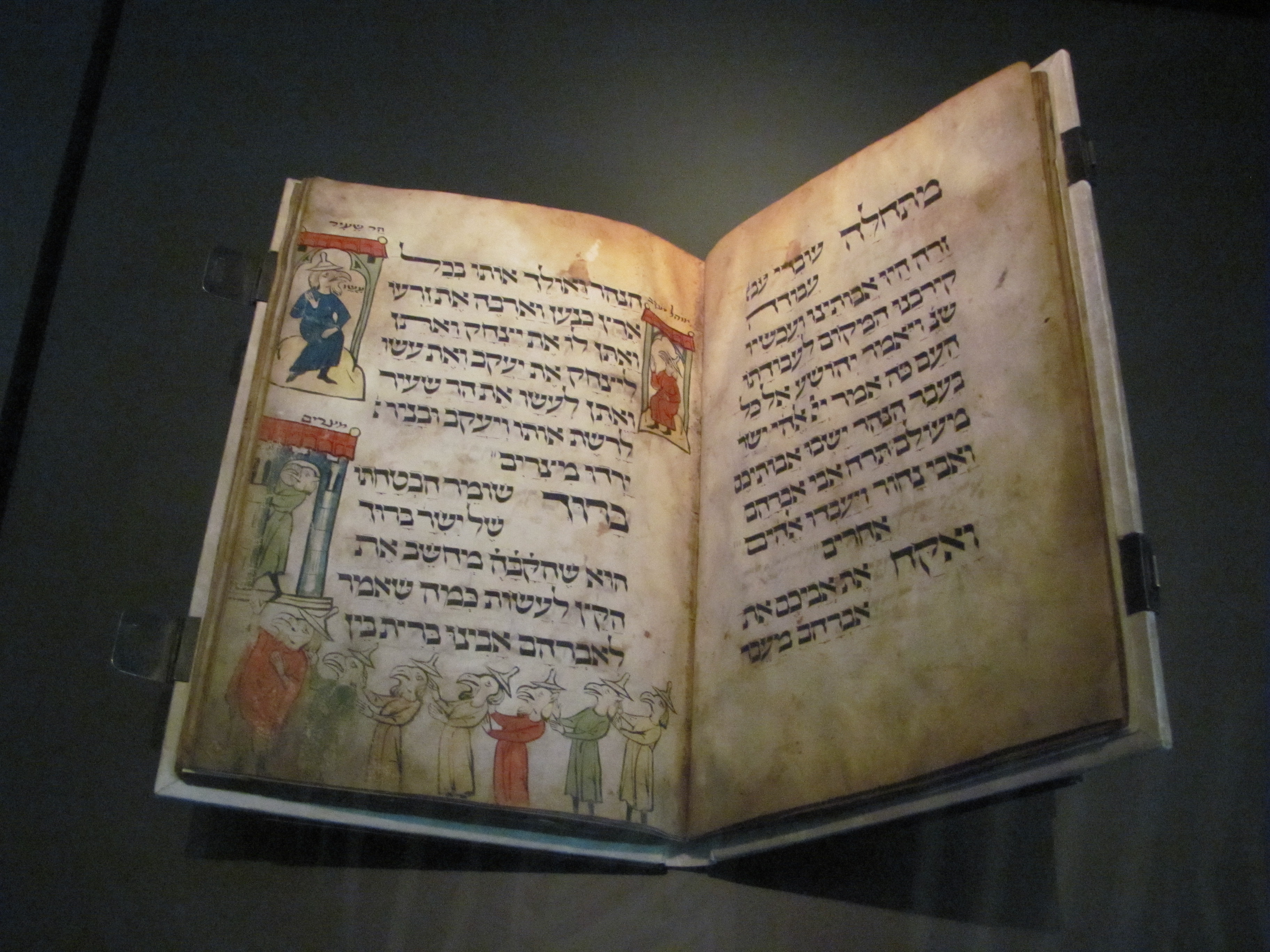
The Birds' Head Haggadah on display at the Israel Museum, 2013

The original patron of the Haggadah is unknown. In the 20th century, the manuscript was owned by the family of Johanna Benedikt, who gave it as a wedding present to Benedikt's new husband, German Jewish lawyer and parliamentarian Ludwig Marum. Marum reportedly stored the manuscript in his law office. Following his arrest and deportation by the Nazis in 1933, the manuscript disappeared. It resurfaced in 1946 in Jerusalem when Herbert Kahn, a German Jewish refugee, sold it to the Bezalel National Museum, the predecessor of the Israel Museum, for $600. The museum keeps the manuscript on permanent exhibition.

Shimon Jeselsohn, a law colleague of Marum in Germany who immigrated to Israel after the war, read about the museum's acquisition of the manuscript and connected it with the work that he had seen in Marum's possession. He wrote to Marum's daughter, Elisabeth, who was then living in New York, to tell her of the Haggadah's whereabouts. In 1984 Elisabeth made a trip to Israel and saw the manuscript in the museum; afterwards she wrote a letter to the museum saying that Kahn "had no right to sell" their family's Haggadah, but that the family would allow the museum to keep the Haggadah on exhibit "for the benefit of the public". According to her daughter, Elisabeth thought there was no way she could retrieve the manuscript, so she did not try to.

=== Ownership dispute ===
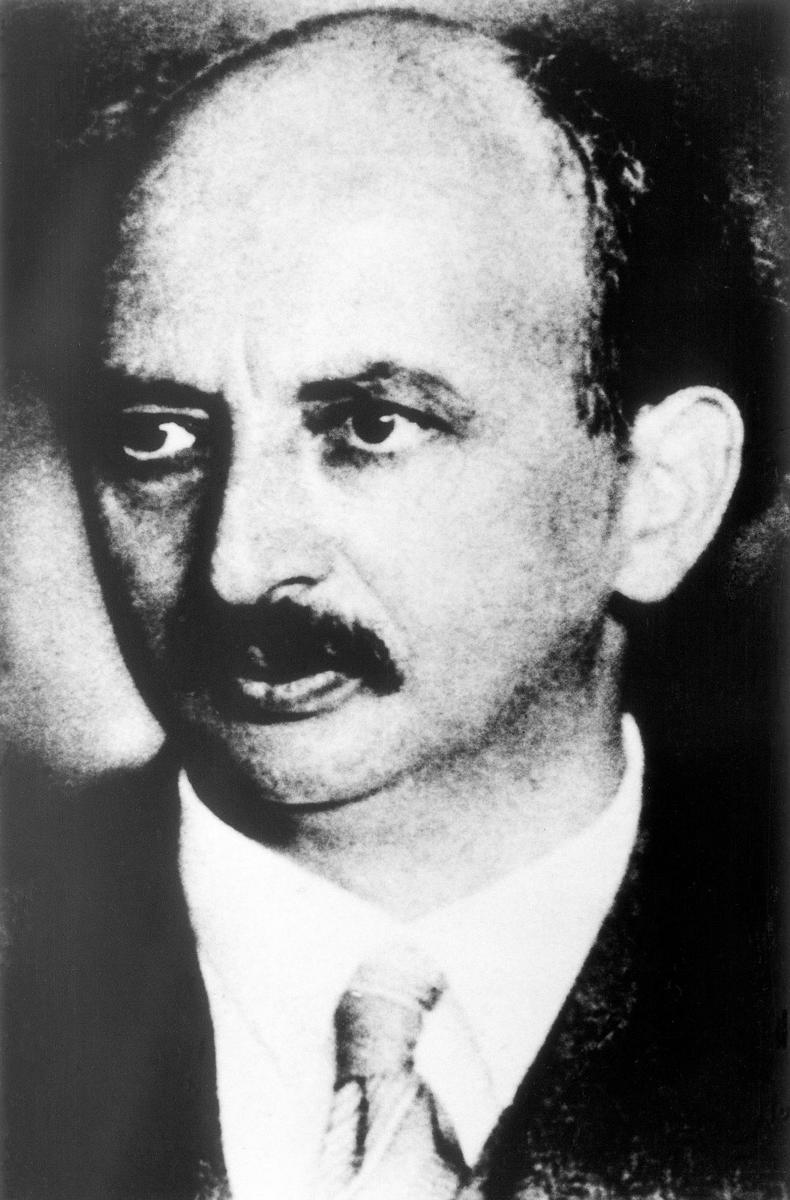
Ludwig Marum

In 2016 Marum's grandchildren, led by Marum's 75-year-old grandson Eli Barzilai, began demanding compensation, claiming the Haggadah had been sold without the family's permission. Barzilai engaged the services of E. Randol Schoenberg, a U.S. attorney specializing in the recovery of Nazi-looted artwork. According to Artnet, the compensation demand was "less than" USD$10 million. In addition to financial reimbursement, the family asked for the manuscript to be renamed the "Marum Haggadah".

The Israel Museum has acknowledged the family's ownership claim predating World War II. It has requested documentation of ownership between 1933 and 1946, at which point it purchased the Haggadah from Kahn. In late 2016 the Marum family obtained more than 1,000 documents from German historians in Karlsruhe, which depict Kahn as a low-paid schoolteacher in constant need of cash. The family asserted that Kahn somehow obtained the Haggadah without their permission, but that they do not think he stole it.

== Other editions ==
In 1965/1967 a two-volume color facsimile edition of the Birds' Head Haggadah was published in Israel by M. Spitzer, bringing the manuscript to international attention.

In 1997 Koren Publishers, in conjunction with the Israel Museum, published The Haggada of Passover: With Pop-Up Spreads, incorporating illustrations from the Birds' Head Haggadah. Designed for children, the book is printed on heavy cardstock and incorporates pop-ups and pull-tabs for users to manipulate the illustrations of the bird-headed characters reenacting historical and Seder practices. The illustrations include the reenactments of the Ten Plagues, baking matzo, crossing the Red Sea, drinking the Four Cups at the Passover Seder, and more. The Haggadah's Hebrew text is supplemented by Koren's English translation. The pop-up book was reprinted in 2008, and again in 2012.

== See also ==
- Sarajevo Haggadah
- Afghan Liturgical Quire (Afghan Siddur)

== Sources ==
- Barash, Moshé; Assmann, Jan; Baumgarten, Albert I., eds. (2001). Representation in Religion: Studies in Honour of Moshe Barasch. BRILL. ISBN 9004119396.
- Blank, Debra Reed, ed. (2011). The Experience of Jewish Liturgy: Studies Dedicated to Menahem Schmelzer. BRILL. ISBN 978-9004201354.
- Bluemel, Nancy Larson; Taylor, Rhonda Harris (2012). Pop-up Books: A Guide for Teachers and Librarians. ABC-CLIO. ISBN 978-1610691543.
- Buda, Zsofia (2005-01-01). "Animals and the Gaze at Women. Zoocephalic Figures in the Tripartite Mahzor". Animal Diversities, ed. Gerhard Jaritz and Alice Choyke, 136-164. Krems, 2005.
- Cohen, Sharonne (2017). "How is This Haggadah Different?". myjewishlearning.com.
- D'Arcy, David (6 April 2016). "Is the Israel Museum's Birds' Head Haggadah Nazi-era loot?". The Art Newspaper. Archived from the original on 24 August 2017.
- Epstein, Marc Michael (2011). The Medieval Haggadah: Art, Narrative, and Religious Imagination. Yale University Press. ISBN 978-0300156669.
- Epstein, Marc Michael (2015). Skies of Parchment, Seas of Ink: Jewish Illuminated Manuscripts. Princeton University Press. ISBN 978-0691165240.
- Estrin, Daniel (21 April 2016). "Jewish Family Makes Claim to Prized Passover Manuscript". Associated Press.
- Fishof, Iris (1994). Jewish Art Masterpieces from the Israel Museum, Jerusalem. H.L. Levin Associates. ISBN 0883631954.
- Gindi, Elie M. (1998). Passover Haggadah. SP Books. ISBN 1561719838.
- Hourihane, Colum, ed. (2012). The Grove Encyclopedia of Medieval Art and Architecture. Vol. 1. OUP USA. ISBN 978-0195395365.
- Italie, Leanne (22 March 2011). "New Maxwell House Haggadah out for Passover". San Diego Union-Tribune.
- Kogman-Appel, Katrin (2012). A mahzor from Worms: art and religion in a medieval Jewish community. Cambridge, Mass: Harvard University Press. ISBN 978-0-674-06454-6. OCLC 756837080.
- Kogman-Appel, Katrin (2018), "Material Culture and Art", The Cambridge History of Judaism, pp. 860–881, doi:10.1017/9781139048880.032, ISBN 978-0-521-51724-9
- Kuruvilla, Carol (22 April 2016). "The Mysterious History Behind The World's Oldest Illustrated Haggadah". Huffington Post.
- Laderman, Shulamit (2014). "Models of Interaction Between Judaism and Christianity As Seen Through Artistic Representations of the Sacrifice of Isaac". In Houtman, Alberdina (ed.). The Actuality of Sacrifice: Past and Present. BRILL. ISBN 978-9004284234.
- Marcus, Ivan G. (2015). Rituals of Childhood: Jewish Acculturation in Medieval Europe. Yale University Press. ISBN 978-0300156744.
- McBee, Richard (4 November 2009). "Leipzig Machzor: A Vision from the Past". The Jewish Press.
- Rapp, David (27 April 2005). "חזירים עם ראשי ציפורים" [Pigs With Birds' Heads]. Haaretz (in Hebrew).
- Roth, Cecil (1 June 1969). "Birds' Heads and Graven Images". Commentary.
- Schapiro, Meyer (1980), "The Bird's Head Haggada, An Illustrated Hebrew Manuscript of ca. 1300 [reprinted Introduction to the text volume of the 1967 facsimile edition]", Late Antique, Early Christian and Medieval Art: Selected Papers, vol. 3, London: Chatto & Windus, ISBN 0701125144
- Touger, Eliyahu (2017). "Chametz U'Matzah – Text of the Haggadah". Chabad.org.
- Zemel, Carol (2016), "Funny-Looking: Thoughts on Jewish Visual Humor", in Lederhendler, Eli; Finder, Gabriel N. (eds.), A Club of Their Own: Jewish Humorists and the Contemporary World, Oxford University Press, ISBN 978-0190646127
