= Mickie Caspi =

Israeli-American calligrapher

Mickie Caspi מייקי כספי
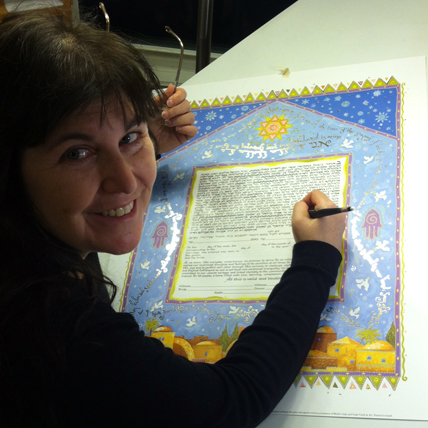
- Mickie Caspi, Israeli-American master calligrapher and artist filling in the Mystic Jerusalem Ketubah, Artists' Studio, December 2014
- Born: Micha Padawer; June 7, 1961 (age 65); Chicago, IL
- Education: Columbia College
- Spouse: Eran Caspi
- Website: caspicards.com

Mickie Caspi (Hebrew: מייקי כספי) is an Israeli-American calligrapher and artist specializing in Judaica.

== Early life and education ==
Caspi was raised in Highland Park, Illinois by two artists, Thelma and Philip Padawer, who encouraged creativity from a young age. She lived in Israel on Kibbutz Nachshon for three years (1970–73). After returning to Highland Park, she studied art at Columbia College in Chicago.

== Career and artistic inspiration ==
Caspi worked as an artist-in-residence at the Kohl Jewish Teacher Center in Wilmette, Illinois. After graduating from Columbia College in 1982, she returned to Israel, living on Kibbutz Harel and then in Jerusalem. She spent seven years as a freelance artist and calligrapher in Israel before returning to the United States in 1989 and establishing Caspi Cards & Art. Her hundreds of original designs have been reproduced on greeting cards, Judaic art prints, calendars and is known for her innovations as a Ketubah artist. She introduced the first pre-printed Same Sex Ketubah text in 1994, predating Same-sex marriage laws in the United States.

Caspi derives her inspiration from many sources, including traditional Jewish motifs, Persian and Arabic illumination, contemporary graphics, as well as art nouveau and art deco. Her art has been exhibited in Jerusalem, Tel Aviv, Chicago, San Francisco and Boston, and her illustrations have appeared in Hebrew children's books and English publications. According to Marc Michael Epstein (scholar of religion, focusing on Jewish religious culture), "Examples by American artist... Mickie Caspi are among the best and brightest examples of motifs often found in ketubot from the late twentieth and early twenty-first centuries."

Caspi volunteered at the Horace Mann School in Newton, Massachusetts. In 2011, the Oakland Hebrew Day School used her artwork as a stepping off point for the students to create their own works of art. She has illustrated books including the 1987 reprint of The Sea's Gift, 1930 [Matnat Ha-Yam] by Levin Kipnis, which represented Israel at the International Children's Book Invitational.

An avid organic gardener, Caspi incorporates the beauty of nature into much of her artwork. She currently resides in Newton, Massachusetts, is married, and has three children and two grandsons.

== Exhibitions and awards ==
- Jacobson, David, (Curator); Equal Vows: Same-Sex Ketubot in Washington State (2012). Conservative Lithograph Ketubah by Mickie Caspi. Seattle, Washington: Linda Hodges Gallery
- Louie Award Finalist. BR405 Bar Mitzvah Card by Mickie Caspi. Jewish Everyday Category Competition (1998)
- Illuminations, an exhibition about History, Continuity and Innovation in the Hebrew Scribal Arts, Jewish Community Museum. San Francisco, CA (1990)
- Art Show Exhibition, Centerpoint. Brookline, MA (December 1989 - February 1990)
- Fisher, Eliezer (Private Collection/Fisher Gallery); Megilot-Ketubot (1986). Ketubah Illustration and Calligraphy by Mickie Klugman. Jerusalem, Israel.

== Publications ==
- Epstein, Marc Michael (Editor) Skies of Parchment, Seas of Ink: Jewish Illuminated Manuscripts (2015); p241-243 Rakefet Ketubah by Mickie Caspi. Princeton University Press (2015). ISBN 978-0300135534.
- Moore, Deborah Dash & Gertz, Nurith (Editors); The Posen Library of Jewish Culture and Civilization, Volume 10: 1973-2005 (2012). p1103 Season's Ketubah by Mickie Caspi. New Haven: Yale University Press. ISBN 978-0300135534.
- Sorrentino, Paolo (Director); This Must Be the Place (2011). Healing Arts Prayer by Mickie Caspi. Images used by Cheyenne Pictures, Inc.
- Abbot, Paul (Creator); Shameles (2011). Jerusalem Rainbow Ketubah and Jewish Art Calendar by Mickie Caspi. Images used by Bonanza Productions.
- Marshall, Scott (Director); Keeping Up with the Steins (2006). Bar Mitzvah Prayer and Man of Honor Blessings by Mickie Caspi. Images used by A Road Picture.
- Diamant, Anita; The New Jewish Baby Book (2005). p200 Noah's Ark by Mickie Caspi. Vermont: Jewish Lights Publishing. ISBN 978-1580232517.
- Diamant, Anita; The New Jewish Wedding (2001). p93-94 Alternative Egalitarian Ketubah Text by Mickie Caspi. New York: Simon & Schuster. ISBN 978-0743202558.
- Hoffman, Edward; The Kabbalah Deck (2000). Calligraphy & Illustration by Mickie Caspi. San Francisco: Chronicle Books. ISBN 978-0811827324.
- Lerner, Rabbi Devon A.; Celebrating Interfaith Marriages (1999). p245-246 Interfaith Ketubah Text by Mickie Caspi. New York: Henry Holt. ISBN 978-0805060836.
- Latner, Helen; The Everything Jewish Wedding Book (1998). p77-78 Interfaith and Egalitarian Ketubah Texts by Mickie Caspi. Massachusetts: Adams Media. ISBN 978-1558508019.
- Stern, David H.; Jewish New Testament (1989). Cover Illustration by Mickie Klugman. Clarksville. ISBN 978-9653590113.
- Kipnis, Levin. (Author); Matnat ha-yam (1987). Illustrated by Mickie Klugman. Tel Aviv: Sifriyat poʻalim. OCLC Number: 19192504.
- Stuhlman, Daniel D. (Author); My Own Pesah Story (1981). Illustrated by Micha Klugman. Chicago: BYLS Press. ISBN 978-0934402101.
