= Genizah =

Area in a synagogue or cemetery for the temporary storage of Jewish writing

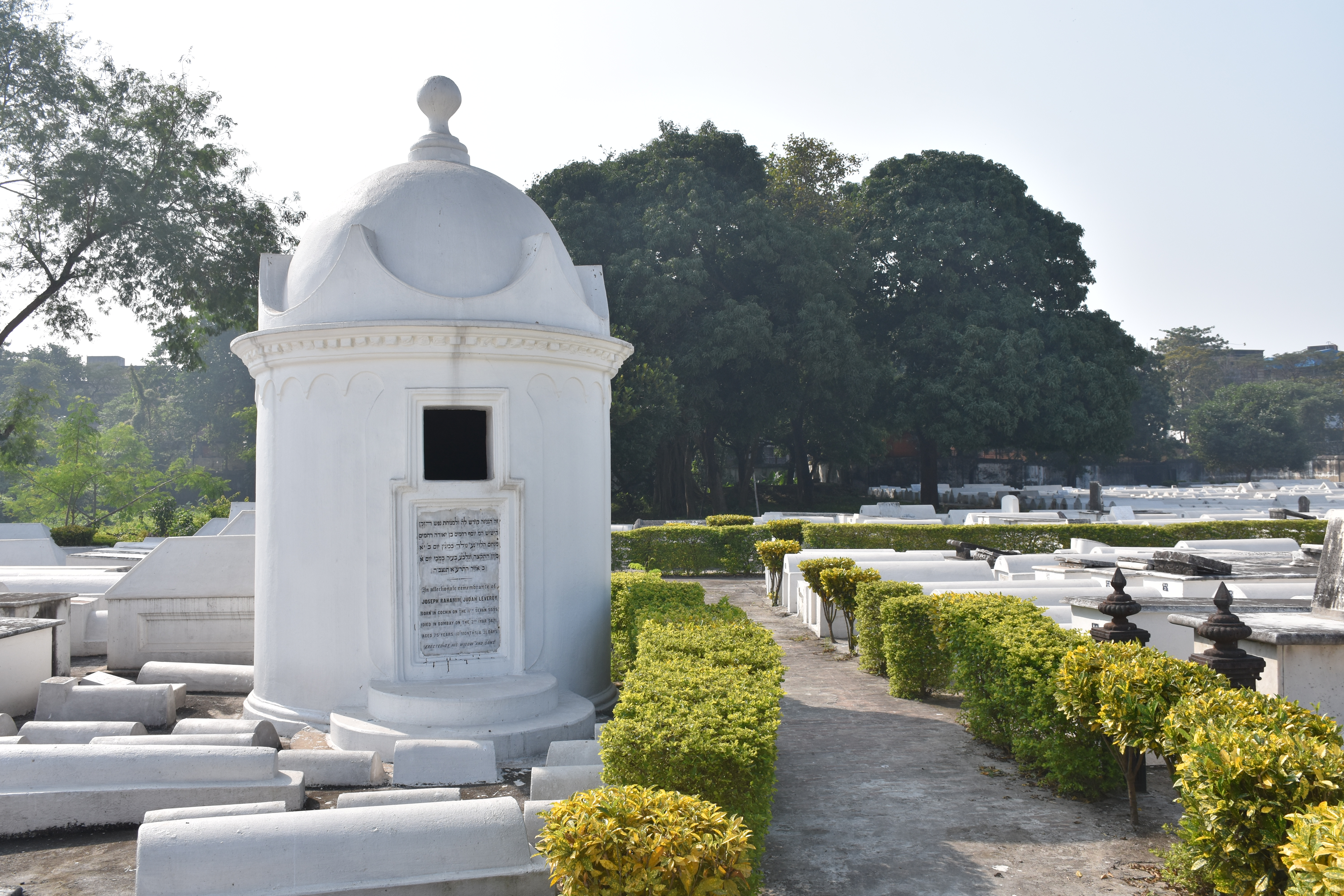
A genizah at the Narkeldanga Cemetery, in Kolkata, India.

A genizah (/ɡɛˈniːzə/; Hebrew: גניזה, lit. 'storage', also geniza; plural: genizot[h] or genizahs) is a storage area in a Jewish synagogue or cemetery designated for the temporary storage of worn-out Hebrew-language books and papers on religious topics prior to proper cemetery burial.

== Etymology ==
The word genizah is a verbal noun, formed from the Hebrew triconsonantal root g-n-z, which covers the semantic field of terms such as "to defend," "to shelter", or "to protect" and "to store," "to hide," and "to bury."

It is also believed by scholars such as Shelomo Dov Goitein to derive from the Persian term ganj, denoting "treasure," and something akin to the term "archive." In medieval Hebrew, it clearly designates the sense it carries today: a repository of discarded writings.

== Description ==
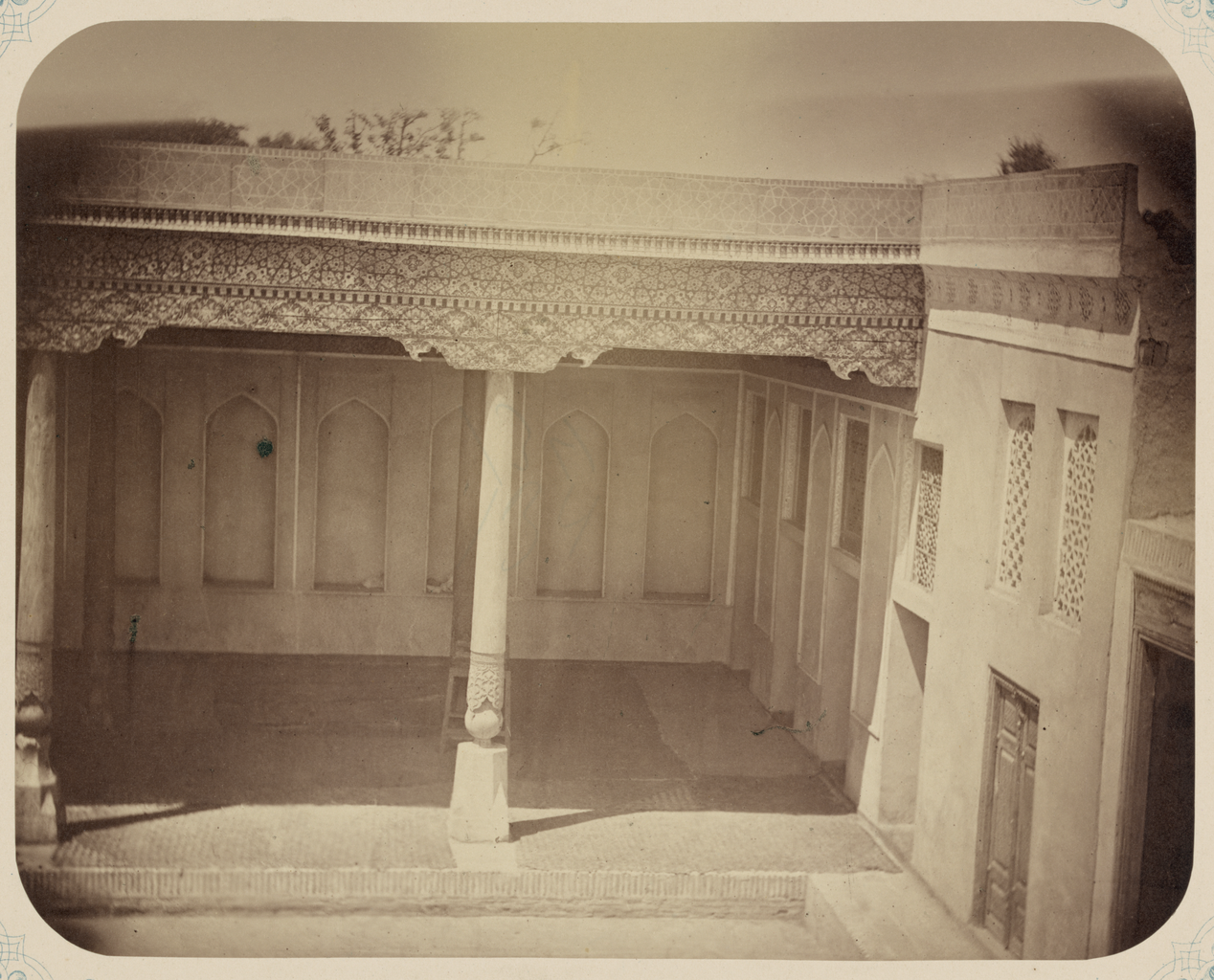
A genizah in a synagogue (Samarkand, Uzbekistan, ca. 1865–72)

Genizot are temporary repositories designated for the storage of worn-out Hebrew language books and papers, typically covering religious topics and/or purposes prior to proper cemetery burial, as it is forbidden to throw away writings containing the name of God. As even personal letters and legal contracts may open with an invocation of God, the contents of genizot have not been limited to religious materials; in practice, they have also contained writings of a secular nature, with or without the customary opening invocation, as well as writings in other Jewish languages that use the Hebrew script (the Judeo-Arabic languages, Judeo-Persian, Judaeo-Spanish, and Yiddish).

Genizot are typically found in the attic or basement of a synagogue, but can also be in walls or buried underground. They may also be located in cemeteries.

The contents of genizot are periodically gathered solemnly and then buried in the cemetery or bet ḥayyim. Synagogues in Jerusalem buried the contents of their genizot every seventh year, as well as during a year of drought, believing that this would bring rain. This custom is associated with the far older practice of burying a great or good man with a sefer (either a book of the Tanakh, or the Mishnah, the Talmud, or any work of rabbinic literature) which has become pasul (unfit for use through illegibility or old age). The tradition of paper-interment is known to have been practiced by Jewish communities such as Morocco, Afghanistan, and Egypt.

== History ==
The Talmud (Tractate Shabbat 115a) directs that holy writings in other than the Hebrew language require genizah, that is, preservation. In Tractate Pesachim 118b, bet genizah is a treasury. In Pesachim 56a, Hezekiah hides (ganaz) a medical work; in Shabbat 115a, Gamaliel orders that the targum to the Book of Job should be hidden (yigganez) under the nidbak (layer of stones). In Shabbat 30b, there is a reference to those rabbis who sought to categorize the books of Ecclesiastes and Proverbs as heretical; this occurred before the canonization of the Hebrew Bible, when disputes flared over which books should be considered Biblical. The same thing occurs in Shabbat 13b in regard to the Book of Ezekiel, and in Pesachim 62 in regard to the Book of Genealogies (Sefer Yochasin, a collection of tannaitic exegesis or midrash on the Book of Chronicles).

In medieval times, Hebrew scraps and papers that were relegated to the genizah were known as shemot 'names', because their sanctity and consequent claim to preservation were held to depend on their containing the "names" of God. In addition to papers, articles connected with ritual, such as tzitzit, lulavim, and sprigs of myrtle, are similarly stored.

By far, the best-known genizah, which is famous for both its size and spectacular contents, is the Cairo Geniza. Recognized for its importance and introduced to the Western world in 1864 by Jacob Saphir, and chiefly studied by Solomon Schechter, Jacob Mann and Shelomo Dov Goitein, the genizah had an accumulation of at least 300,000 Jewish manuscripts and manuscript fragments dating from 870 to the 19th century. These materials were important for reconstructing the religious, social and economic history of Jews, especially in the Middle Ages.

In 1927, a manuscript containing Nathan ben Abraham's 11th-century Mishnah commentary was discovered in the genizah of the Jewish community of Sanaa, Yemen. Nathan had served as President of the Academy under the revised Palestinian geonate, shortly before its demise in the early 12th century CE. In 2011, the so-called Afghan Geniza, an 11th-century collection of manuscript fragments in Hebrew, Aramaic, Judaeo-Arabic and Judeo-Persian, was found in Afghanistan, in caves used by the Taliban.

In Germanic lands genizot have been preserved in buildings dating back to the early modern period and till today, dozens of genizot have been saved. Researchers began to study the material, soon realizing that these findings could provide insight into the life of Jewish rural communities from the 17th to 19th century. The Genisaprojekt Veitshöchheim and other researchers are dealing with the inventory, the digitization and the publication of the finds.

== Today ==
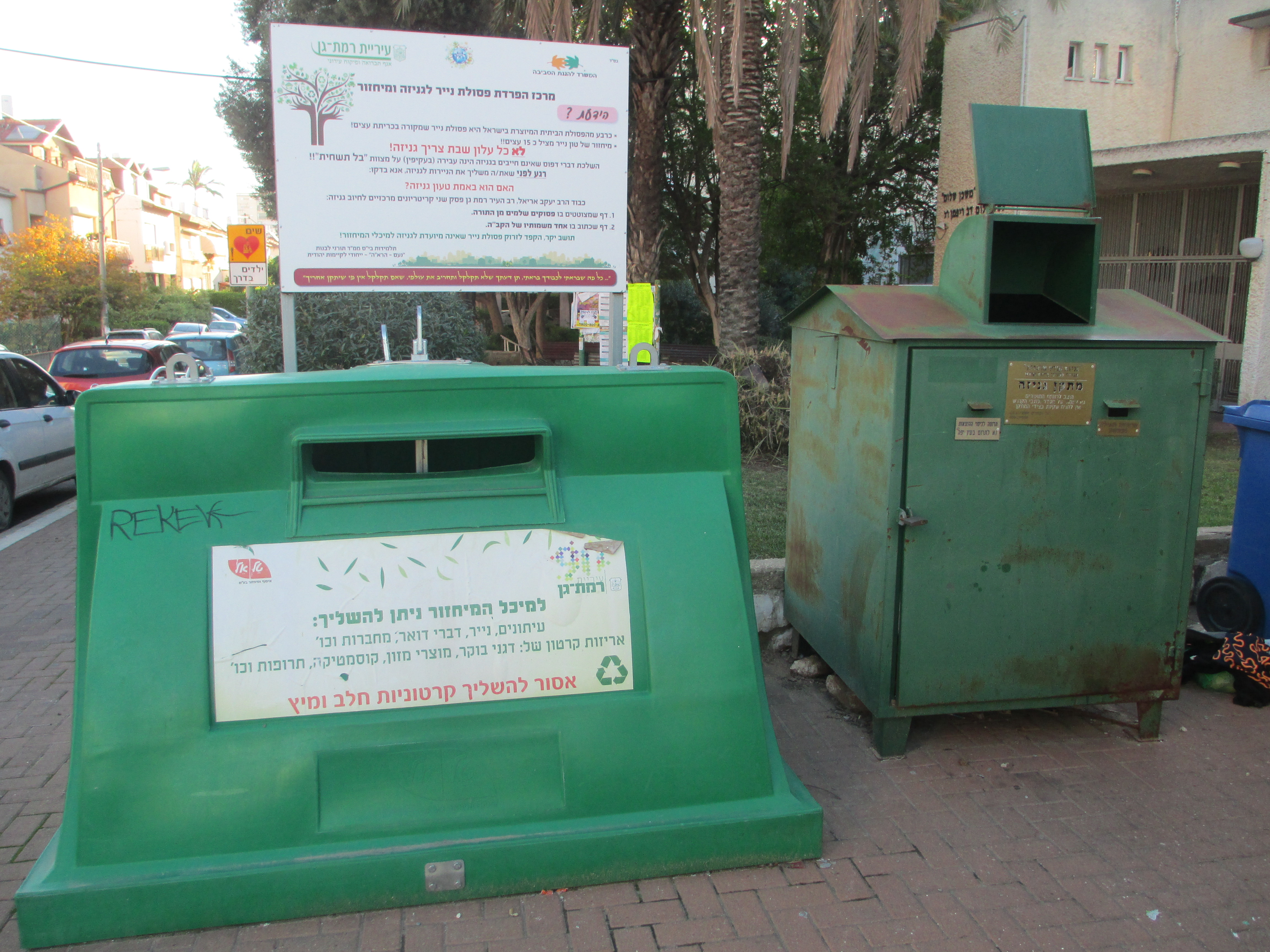
Containers for paper recycling (left) and genizah (right) in Ramat Gan

In Israel, in addition to collections of genizah material organised by individual congregations, public genizah containers (not unlike receptacles for paper recycling found in other countries) can be found in cities and towns.

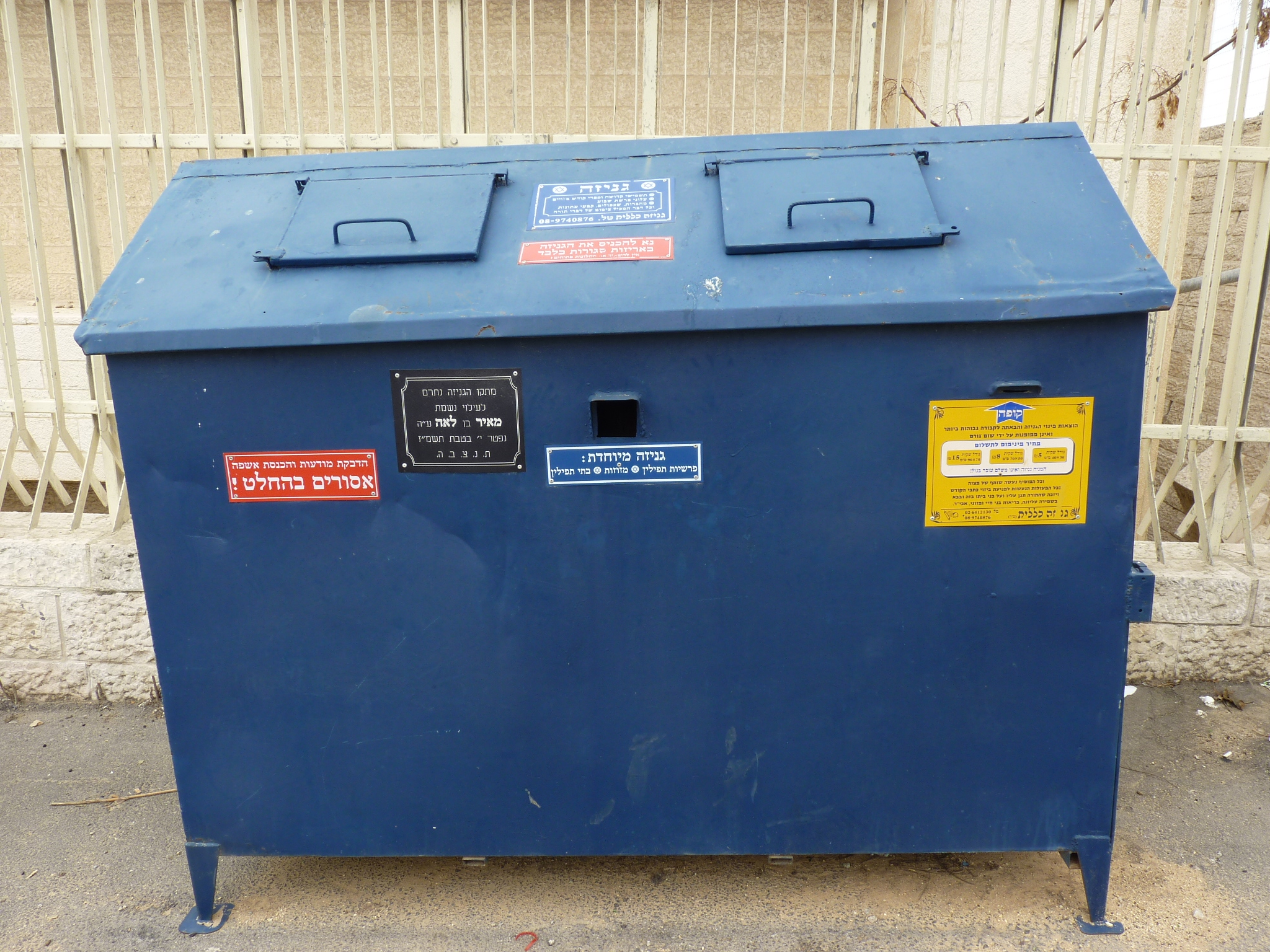
Modern genizah collection receptacle in Israel. The small opening at the front is for disposal of worn-out tefillin and mezuzot.
