= Ludwig Marum =

German politician (1882–1934)

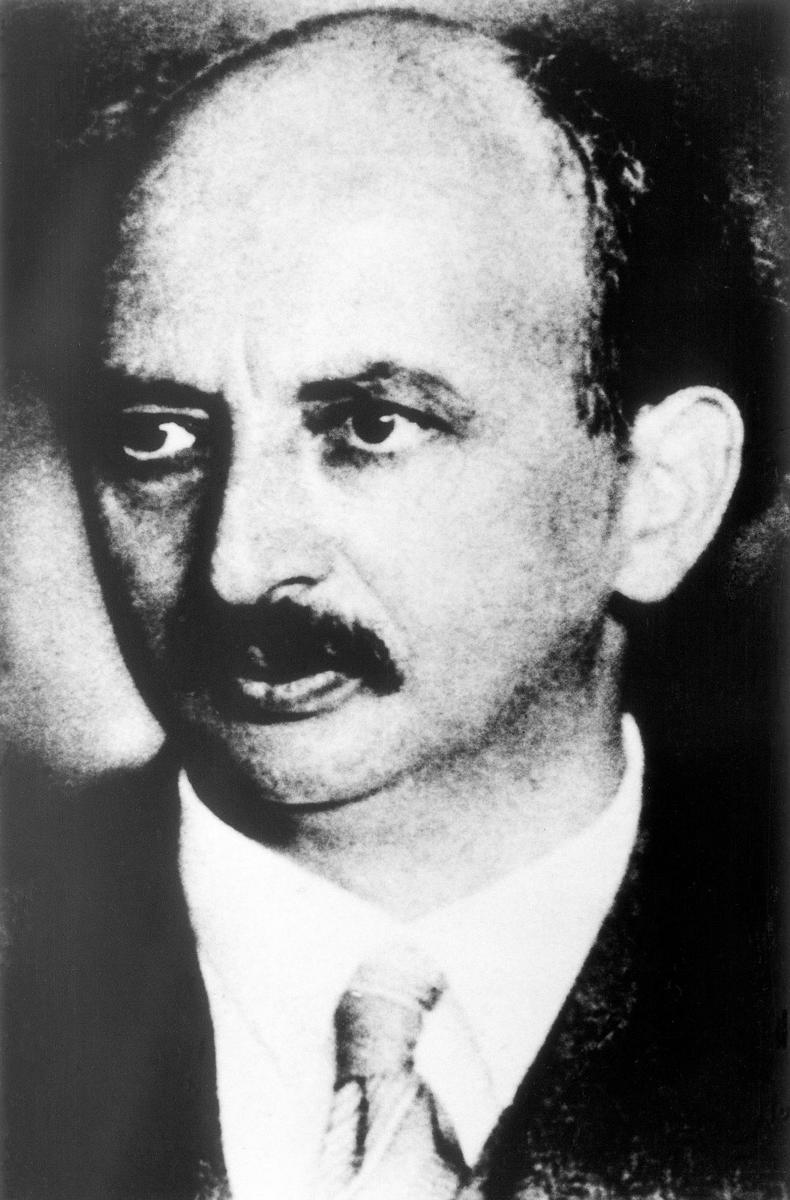
Ludwig Marum

Ludwig Marum (5 November 1882 – 2 April 1934) was a German Jewish politician and an early victim of the Nazi Party after it came to power in 1933.

== Biography ==
Ludwig Marum was born on 5 November 1882 to a lower-middle-class Jewish merchant's family in the town of Frankenthal in southwestern Germany. After studying law at the University of Heidelberg and in Munich, he married Johanna Benedick. The couple received the famed Birds' Head Haggadah as a wedding present from Benedick's family. Marum then went on to practice law in Karlsruhe where his children Elizabeth, Hans Karl and Eva Brigitte were born between 1910 and 1919.

He joined the SPD in 1914 and after the 1918 revolution in Baden was briefly Justice Minister in the new Republic of Baden. By 1922 Marum was the only notable Jew in any state government.

In 1928 Ludwig Marum was elected member of the Reichstag (German Parliament) for Karlsruhe. After the Reichstag fire and the passing of the Enabling Act of 1933, Marum was publicly deported to the Kislau concentration camp on 16 May 1933 together with six other SPD members of the Karlsruhe Landtag. The SPD itself was banned by the Nazis on 22 June 1933. Marum was murdered at Kislau by the SS on the night of 28–29 March 1934.

His daughter Eva Brigitte was murdered at Sobibor concentration camp in 1943.

== See also ==
- List of Social Democratic Party of Germany politicians
- Birds' Head Haggadah, owned by Marum before his death
