= Afghan Geniza =

Collection of Jewish manuscripts

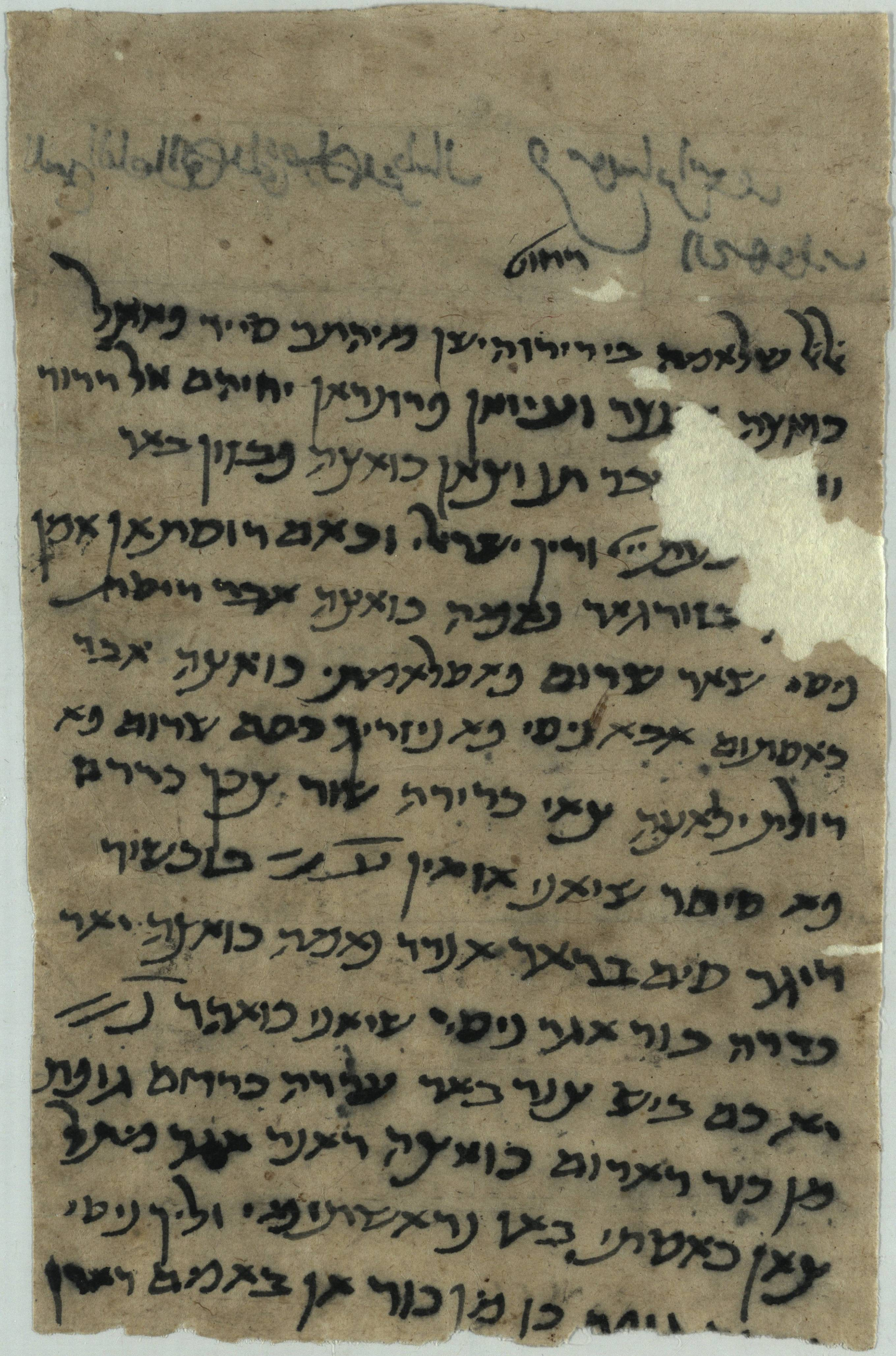
A letter in Judeo-Persian dealing with financial and family matters (Afghan Genizah collection at the National Library of Israel).

The Afghan Geniza (or Genizah) is a collection of hundreds of Jewish manuscript fragments found in a genizah in the caves of Afghanistan. The manuscripts include writings in Hebrew, Aramaic, Judeo-Arabic and Judeo-Persian, some of which are 1,000 years old. They specifically date from the early 11th through to the early 13th century. Their existence first became known when local Afghan antiquities dealers began offering them to Israeli institutions in the early 2010s.

Before the discovery of these materials, there was only limited documentary evidence that Jews had settled in that area, and little that provided insight on their culture and daily life. Therefore, researchers deem this collection the most important finding of documentary sources since the discovery of the Cairo Geniza more than 100 years prior.

In 2013, the National Library of Israel announced that it had purchased 29 pages from this cache of documents and another 250 or so in 2016. In 2020, they became part of the Arts and Humanities Research Council and European Research Council-funded University of Oxford-based research project Invisible East.

== Misnomer ==
A genizah is a storeroom near a synagogue or Jewish cemetery that is dedicated to Jewish documents; spaces like these were created because Jewish law bans the discarding of writings that bore the name of God. However, the manuscripts found in Afghanistan have no known association to such a space, nor do the majority seem to share an origin in terms of location and time period; they are presently linked together due to their mass purchase by the National Library of Israel. Nonetheless, the usage of the misnomer continues out of convenience and its evocation of the wider-known Cairo Genizah.

== Provenance ==
In terms of geographic provenance, while many of these objects’ origins are uncertain, a majority of them hail from the northern Afghan regions of Bamiyan, Ghur, Rob, and Balkh. The contents were found in a cave close to the Iran-Uzbekistan border by a group of locals; this archive likely belonged to a family of Jewish traders who participated in the Silk Road trade in the region. The details surrounding their travel from these areas to their place of discovery to arriving at the locations where they’re currently kept are subject to much speculation. However, because they circulated amongst antiquities dealers before their purchase by the National Library of Israel, it is highly likely that they were illegally trafficked from their places of origin. Therefore, a controversy exists around the ethics of their acquisition and digitization by the institution, with some scholars arguing that it normalizes their use outside of their country of origin and encourages academic interest, thus further incentivizing the illegal antiquities trade. Other scholars advocate for the analysis and mass distribution of this information in order to substantialize and remedy the current knowledge in circulation about the Islamic world because these documents showcase the pluralistic coexistence of Muslims and non-Muslims during that period. They are currently being investigated as part of the University of Oxford’s Invisible East project.

== Contents ==
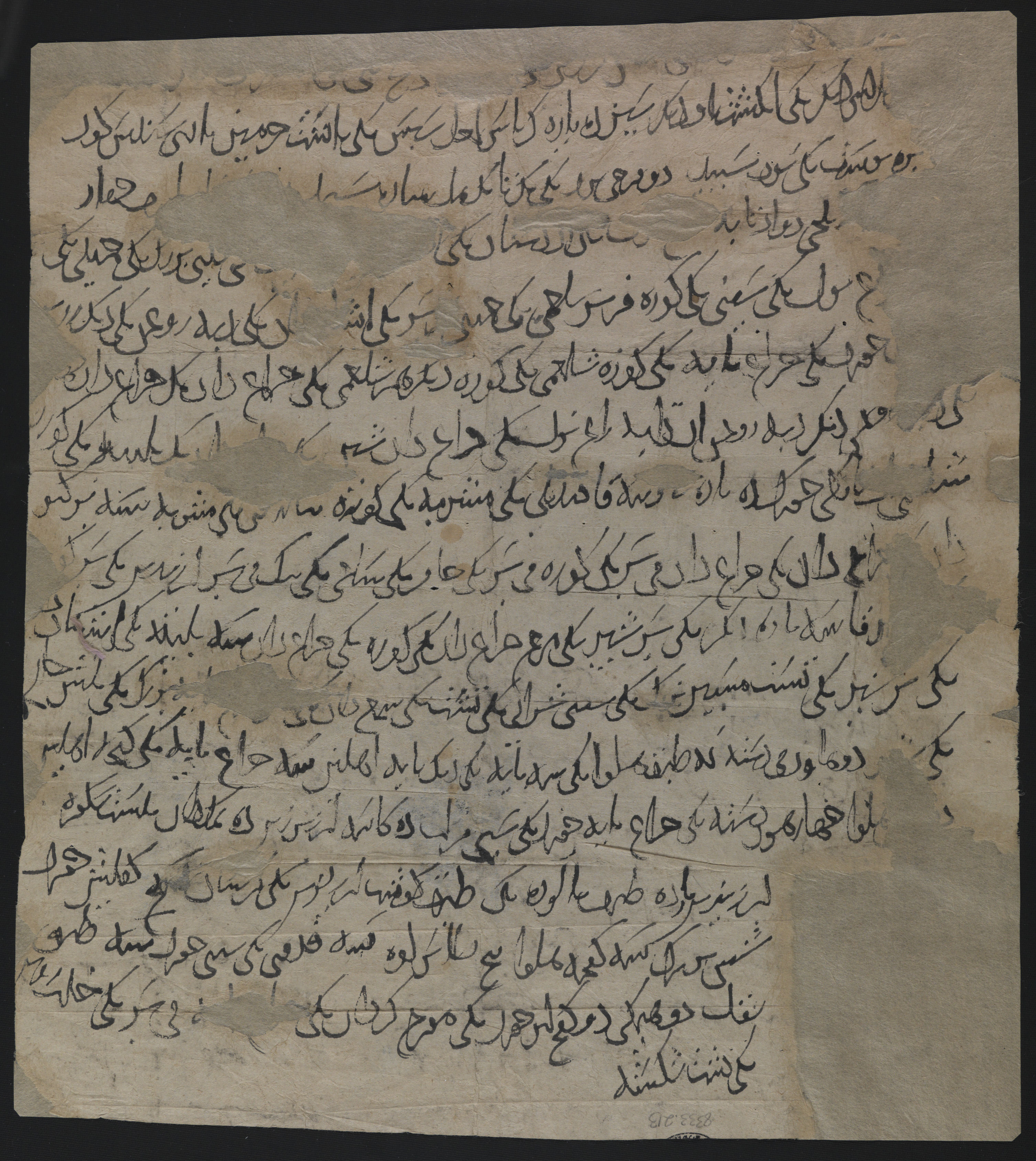
List of various goods written in Persian from the National Library of Israel's collection of documents from the Afghan Genizah.

The majority (more than eighty percent) of the Afghan Genizah is documentary in nature. These include administrative documents, account books, miscellaneous lists, letters, and legal documents. These documentary files can generally be split up into two groups: the first includes documents from the early 11th century while the second group includes documents from the end of the 12th century and early 13th century. A majority of the documents in the first group deal with a Bamyan family that lived during the early Ghaznavid Period.

In addition to the documentary texts, the collection also includes fragments of religious and literary works in a variety of different languages. Included in these religious works is a collection of prayers written in early Judeo-Persian.

The Afghan Liturgical Quire, the oldest Hebrew book ever discovered, was found at the Afghan Geniza.

== See also ==
- Cairo Geniza, similar cache of ancient religious and secular documents
- Dunhuang manuscripts, similar cache of ancient religious and secular documents
- Elephantine papyri and ostraca
- Herculaneum papyri, similar cache of ancient religious and secular documents
- History of the Jews in Afghanistan
- Timbuktu manuscripts
- European Geniza
