= Kislau concentration camp =

Concentration camp in Nazi Germany

Coordinates: 49.2160°N 8.6445°E

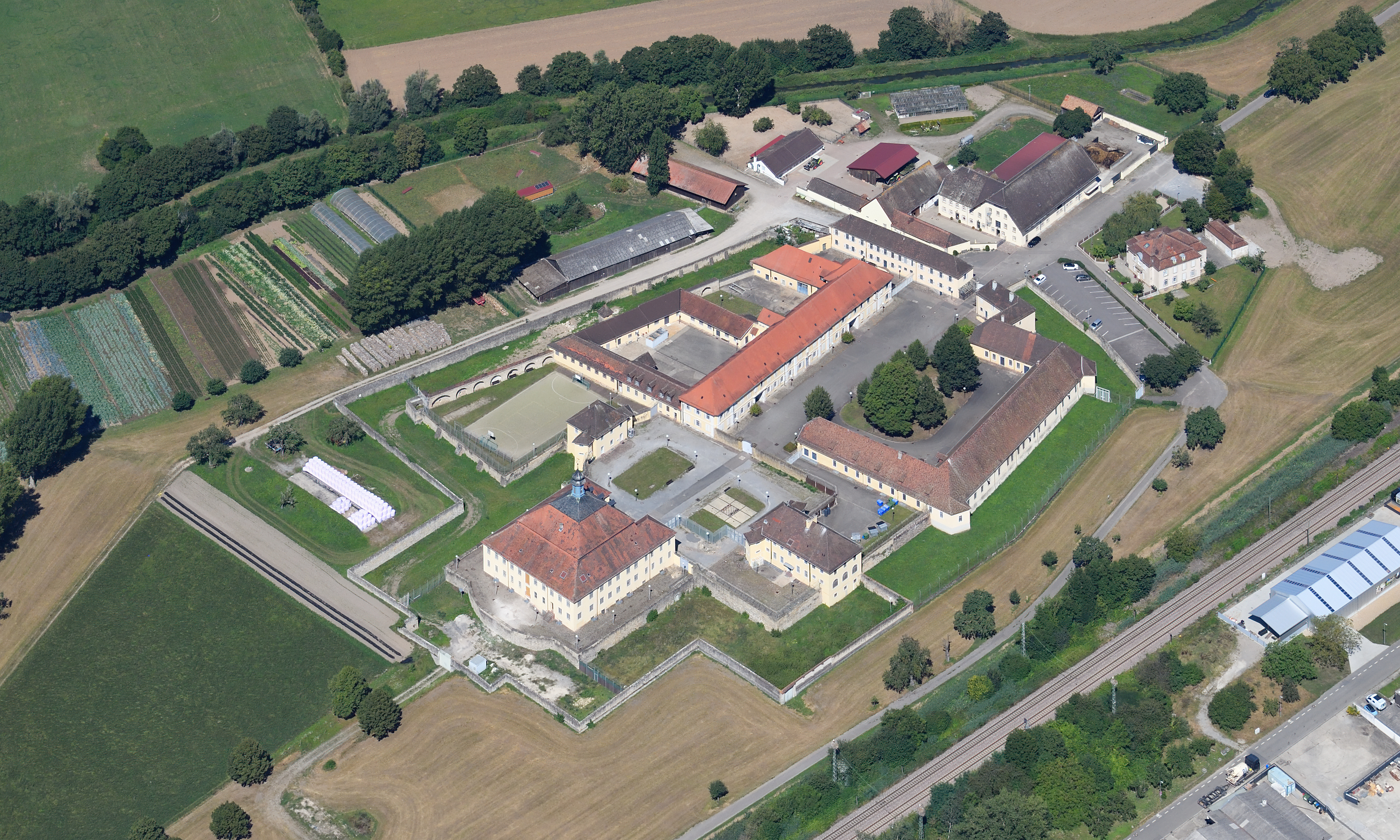
Aerial view of Kislau Castle

The Kislau concentration camp, also known as KZ Kislau in German, was a concentration camp operating in Nazi Germany from April 21, 1933, until April 1, 1939.

The Kislau concentration camp was located at the Kislau Castle in Baden-Württemberg. Before turning into a concentration camp, Kislau Castle served several purposes. In 1721, after it was initially constructed, it became a hunting lodge. Several decades later, in 1813, it was converted into a hospital and military barracks. In 1824, the castle became a state prison and a workhouse, with the workhouse being housed within the castle itself. And finally, in 1933, after the Nazis seized power, part of Kislau Castle turned into a concentration camp.

Unlike most concentration camps, Kislau was overseen by the Baden Interior Ministry rather than the CCI. Kislau mainly functioned as a concentration camp for political prisoners as well as a re-education camp. Ludwig Marum, a socialist member of parliament, was murdered at Kislau by SA and SS guards in 1934. After the Kislau KZ closed in 1939, its inmates were transferred to the Dachau concentration camp.

After its closure, the Kislau prison and workhouse continued operating through the entire Nazi era. In 1940, two of Himmler's representatives inspected the site to see if it could still be utilized as a concentration camp, but the plan never became a reality. In the spring of 1944, after the Mannheim and Saarbrücken prisons were severely damaged by Allied air raids, Kislau prison accommodated the inmates from both Mannheim and Saarbrücken.

Today, there is a memorial plaque commemorating the victims of the Holocaust and those who were imprisoned at the Kislau concentration camp.
