= Afghan Liturgical Quire =

Hebrew manuscript from the 700s CE

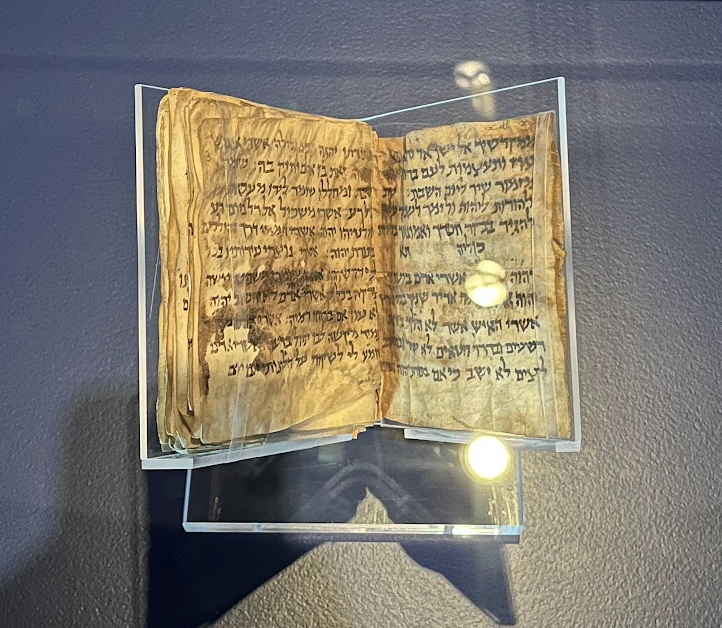
The Afghan Liturgical Quire on display at the Museum of the Bible.

The Afghan Liturgical Quire (ALQ), also known as the Afghan Siddur, is a quire from the Afghan Geniza in Bamyan, Afghanistan. It is the oldest Hebrew codex ever discovered, and contains Hebrew liturgical texts, including prayers, blessings, and piyyuṭ. The manuscript was written in Hebrew, Aramaic and Judeo-Persian. The book is currently a part of the collection at the Museum of the Bible in Washington, D.C.

For an unknown reason, a portion of the Passover haggadah is upside-down in the book.

== History ==
The manuscript was originally believed to have come from the Cairo Geniza in Egypt with an estimated origin from the 900s CE. In 2016, a photograph of the book in Afghanistan from 1997 was discovered, which led to radiometric dating tests on four parts of the manuscript. These parts of the manuscript were dated to c. 780 CE in 2019.

The book was found by a Hazara man, who gave it to a local Afghan leader. In 2013, the manuscript was purchased by Steve Green, president of Hobby Lobby and founder of the Museum of the Bible. It was later donated to the museum, which opened in 2017.

== See also ==
- Leningrad Codex
