= Marc Michael Epstein =

Academic

Marc Michael Epstein is Professor of Religion and Visual Culture on the Mackie M. Paschall (1899) and Norman Davis Chair at Vassar College.

== Education ==
Epstein received his B.A. from Oberlin College and earned the M.A., M.Phil., and PhD degrees in Religious Studies at Yale University. He completed much of his graduate research at the Hebrew University of Jerusalem.

== Career ==
Epstein is a scholar of religion, focusing on Jewish and Christian religious culture in the Middle Ages. The objects of his study are monuments of visual and material culture. He has written on various topics regarding Jewish visual and material culture, and many of his publications concern Medieval manuscript illumination. His book Skies of Parchment, Seas of Ink: Jewish Manuscript Illumination (2015) was awarded the Jewish Book Council's National Jewish Book Award (winner in Visual Arts and finalist in Scholarship. The Medieval Haggadah: Art, Narrative and Religious Imagination (2011), was named one of the “Best Books of the Year” by the London Times Literary Supplement.

Epstein was Director of the Hebrew Books and Manuscripts division of Sotheby's Judaica Department throughout the 1980s, and continued to work as a consultant of rare Hebrew Books and Manuscripts. He continues to be a consultant and curator to a number of museums, auction houses, libraries, and private collections, notably including the Herbert and Eileen Bernhard Museum at Temple Emanu-El, the Goldsmith Family Museum and the Jewish Museum London.

Epstein's academic stance suggests that medieval Jewish and Christian visual culture as mutually interdependent. In his teaching and written work, he shows that there was a curiosity regarding Christian visual culture on the part of Jews both in Iberia and Franco-Germany, resulting in equal measures of reactive avoidance and fascinated emulation of that culture. His first book conceptualized Jewish iconography as almost inevitably polemicizing against Christian images, expressing "messages of protest and dreams of subversion," —a "love story in aggressive garb." He has subsequently moderated his position to acknowledge that neither Jews nor Christians owned medieval visual culture, positing a much more "open" Middle Ages, with a stream of essentially common culture drawn upon by both Jews and Christians in "a sort of parallel fishing expedition." He continues to observe that concertedly Christian motifs were occasionally—even often—adapted by Jews with didactic or polemic intent (the Flight into Egypt is a particularly obvious example). But he has come to recognize that this is not always, or even usually, the case. His works testify that if one has to posit a viable tradition of Jewish iconography, one needs to stand up for the independence or interdependence of that tradition, rather than revert to a codependent model.

Epstein has served as the Corcoran Visiting Chair of Jewish-Christian Relations at Boston College, and as the Shoshana Shier Distinguished Visiting Professor of Jewish Studies at The University of Toronto.

== Bibliography ==
Books

"If Lions Could Carve Stones..." The Medieval Jewish Minority and the Allegorization of the Animal Kingdom: A Textual and Iconographic Study (Ann Arbor: University Microfilms, 1993)

The Jerusalem Haggadah: Gateway to the Haggadah (Jerusalem: Aryeh Editions, 1997)

Dreams of Subversion in Medieval Jewish Art and Literature. (University Park: Penn State University Press, 1997)

The Medieval Haggadah: Art, Narrative and Religious Imagination (New Haven, London: Yale University Press, 2011)

Skies of Parchment, Seas of Ink: Jewish Manuscript Illumination (Princeton, London: Princeton University Press, 2015)

The Brother Haggadah: A Medieval Sephardi Masterpiece in Facsimile (London, New York: Thames and Hudson, 2016)
