= Charoset =

Jewish ritual food eaten at the Passover seder

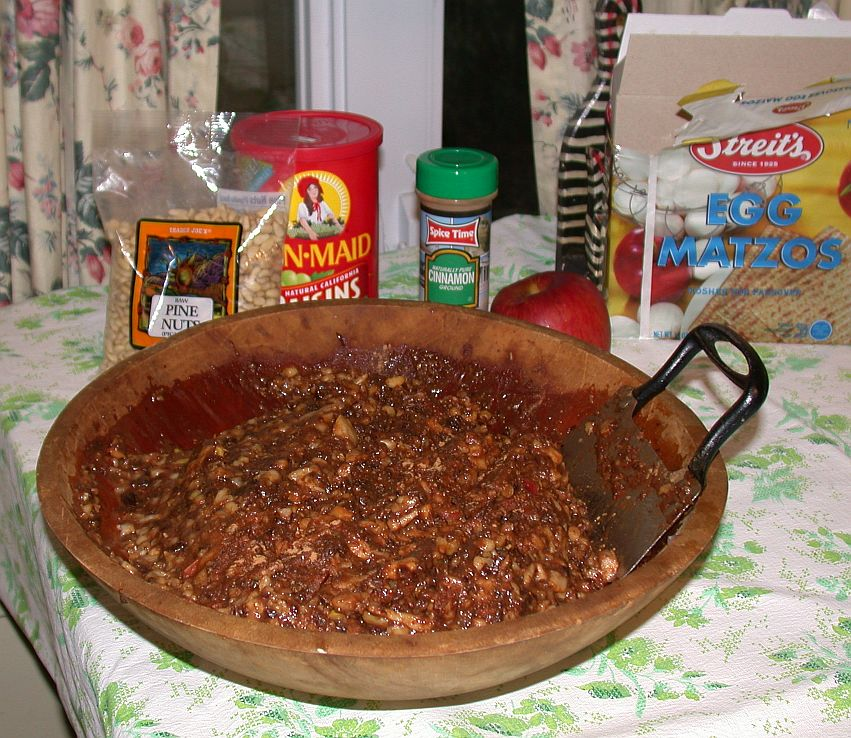
- Alternative names: duqqa, dukah, dukeh
- Course: Sweet relish
- Place of origin: Land of Israel
- Region or state: Jewish Diaspora, Ashkenaz, Sepharad, Israel
- Main ingredients: Apples, pears, raisins, figs, orange juice, red wine, pine nuts and cinnamon
- Variations: Dates, walnuts, sesame, wine vinegar, cinnamon, black pepper, marjoram

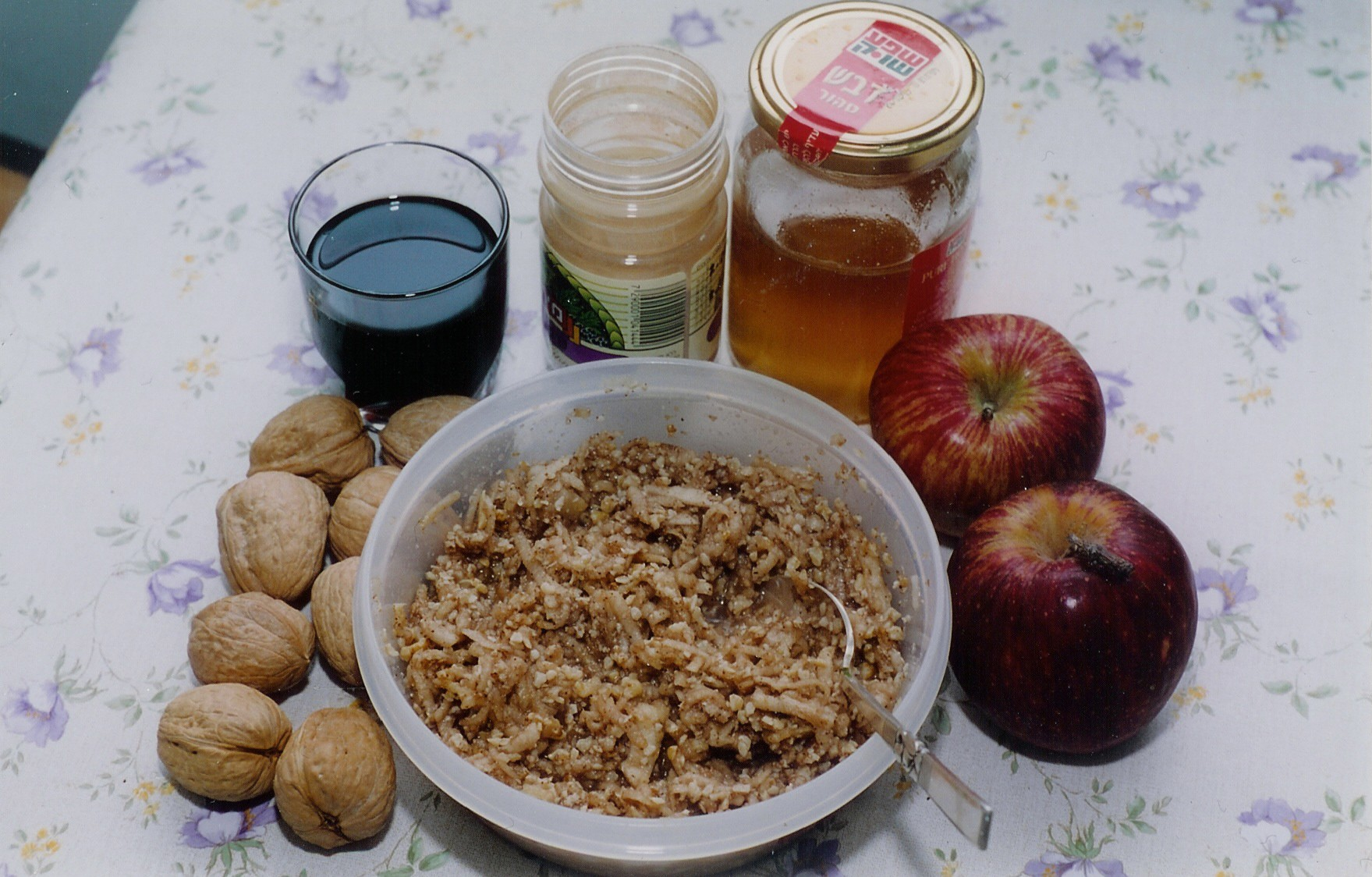
Ashkenazi-style haroset made from apples, walnuts, red wine and cinnamon

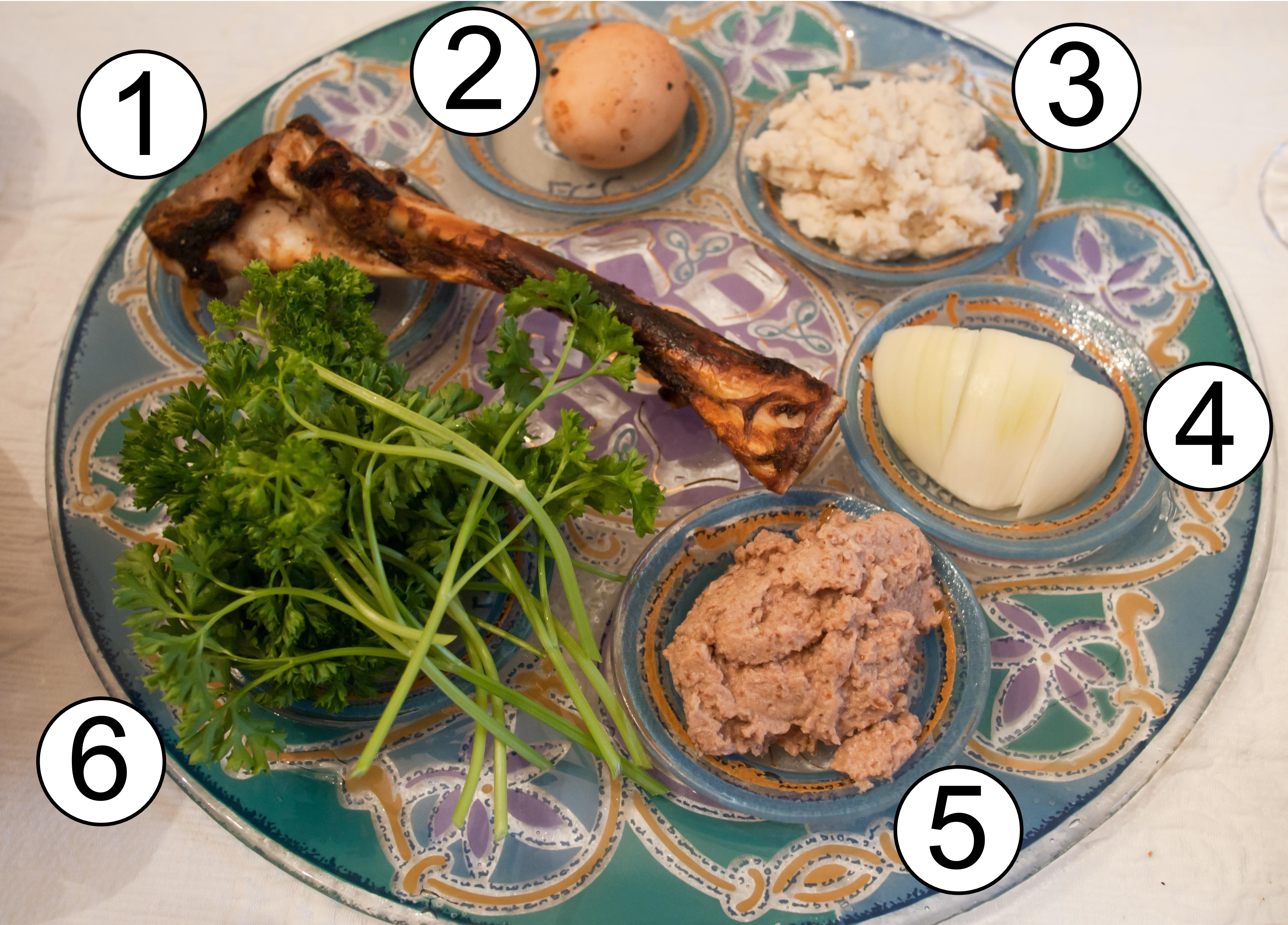
Passover Seder plate. Categories (with imaged examples in brackets): 1. Zeroa (shankbone); 2. Beitza (roasted hard-boiled egg); 3. Maror/Chazeret (horseradish); 4. Maror/Chazeret (onion); 5. Charoset; 6. Karpas (parsley)

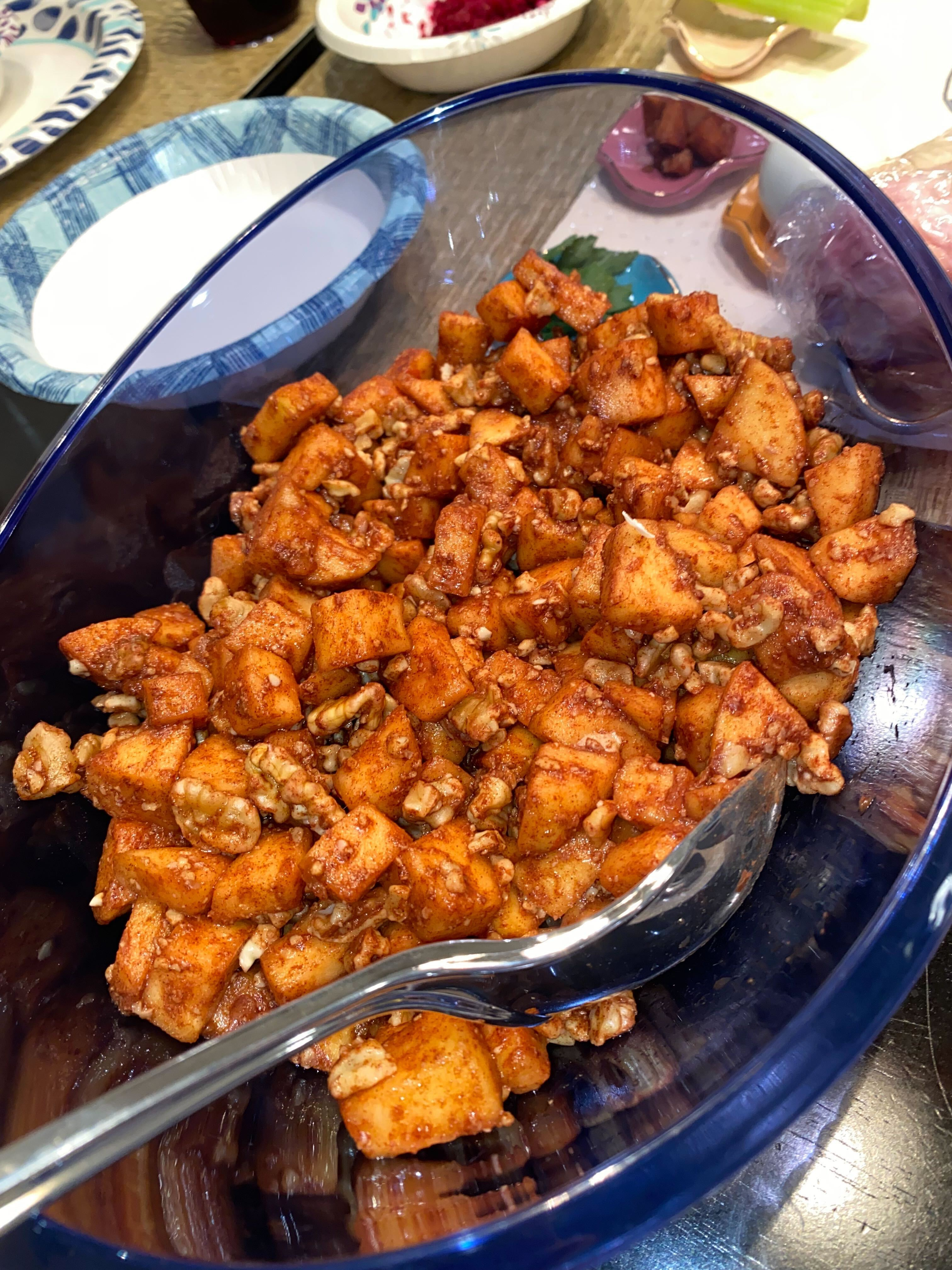
Charoset served on Passover

Charoset (Note: Also haroset, or charoises (Hebrew: חֲרֽוֹסֶת, romanized: ḥəróseṯ, Yiddish: חרוסת, romanized: kheróyses).) is a sweet, dark-colored mixture of finely chopped fruits and nuts eaten at the Passover Seder. According to the Talmud, its color and texture are meant to recall mortar (or mud used to make adobe bricks), which the Israelites used during their enslavement in Ancient Egypt, as mentioned in Tractate Pesahim 116a of the Talmud. The word comes from the Hebrew word for clay (Hebrew: חֶרֶס, romanized: ḥéres).

Charoset is one of the symbolic foods on the Passover Seder plate. After reciting the blessings, and eating first maror dipped in charoset and then a matzah "Hillel sandwich" (with two matzot) combining charoset and maror, people often eat the remainder spread on matzah.

== History ==
Charoset is mentioned in the Mishna in connection with the items placed on the Passover table: "unleavened bread and lettuce and charoset". Some say it can be traced back to the custom of symposia in ancient Greece, where philosophical discussions were accompanied by drinking large quantities of wine and consuming foods dipped into mixtures of pounded nuts and spices.

== Variations ==
There are many recipes for charoset. Many include at least some of the fruits and spices mentioned in the Song of Songs: apples 2-3, figs 2-13, pomegranates 4-3, grapes 2-15, walnuts 6-11, dates 7-7 with the addition of wine 1-2, saffron 4-14 and cinnamon 4-14. According to Jonathan Brumberg-Kraus "the influence of Persian culinary preferences on Jews living in the medieval Islamic empires probably reinforced this 'Song of Songs' flavor profile.

The spices used vary among cultures; Yemenites use cloves and pepper, while American Jews typically use cinnamon. In Italy, Venetian Jews have been known to add chestnuts and pine nuts. Halegh is a variation made by Persian Jews using dates instead of or in addition to apples. Locally grown blueberries are added to the traditional recipe in Maine.

=== Sephardi traditions ===
Sephardi charoset is a paste made of raisins, figs and dates.

Egyptian Jews make it from dates, raisins, walnuts, cinnamon, and sweet wine.

Greek and Turkish Jews use apples, dates, chopped almonds, and wine. Italian Jews add chestnuts.

Suriname Jews add coconut.

Iraqi Jews make it from a mixture of dates and nuts.

Moroccan Jews use a mixture consisting of walnuts, almonds, dates, figs, dried apricots, pitted prunes, and sweet red Passover wine, with optional additions such as shelled pistachios or ground cinnamon. The ingredients are blended or ground together and shaped into one-inch balls.

=== Yemenite tradition ===
Yihye Bashiri (17th century) described the manner in which the charoset was made in Yemen:

They take figs or raisins or dates, and pound them into the consistency of dough. They then put vinegar thereto, and add spices. Some there are who put ground sesame seeds into this admixture. On the night of the Passover, a person is required to put therein whole spices that have not been ground; either two or three seeds of valerian (Arabic: sunbul), or sprigs of marjoram [alternatively: wild thyme ] (Arabic: za'tar), or savory (Arabic: hasha), or things similar to them, so that it will resemble straw in mortar—in remembrance of that thing by which our fathers were enslaved in Egypt, seeing that it is like unto bricks and straw.

In Yemenite Jewish tradition, the charoset is also called dukeh (Hebrew: דוכה), a name also referred to as such in the Jerusalem Talmud.

=== Mizrahi traditions ===
Not all Jews use the term charoset. Some of the Jews of the Middle East instead use the term "halegh". The origin of halegh is not clear. Rav Saadia Gaon uses the word and attributes it to a kind of walnut that was a mandatory ingredient in the preparation of the halegh.

Parts of the Jewish Diaspora in Iran have a tradition of including 40 different ingredients in the halegh. The number 40 signifies the 40 years of wandering in the desert.

=== Ashkenazi traditions ===
Eastern European (or Ashkenazi) charoset is made from chopped walnuts and apples, spiced with cinnamon and sweet red wine. Honey or sugar may be added as a sweetener and binder. The mixture is not cooked.

== Modern variations ==
In 2015 Ben & Jerry's Charoset ice cream became widely available in Israel and was covered in several major news outlets.

== Leftovers ==
Leftover charoset is commonly eaten with matzah, but it can also be used as a filling for hand pies, rugelach, or even strudel.
