= Maror =

Bitter herbs eaten during Passover

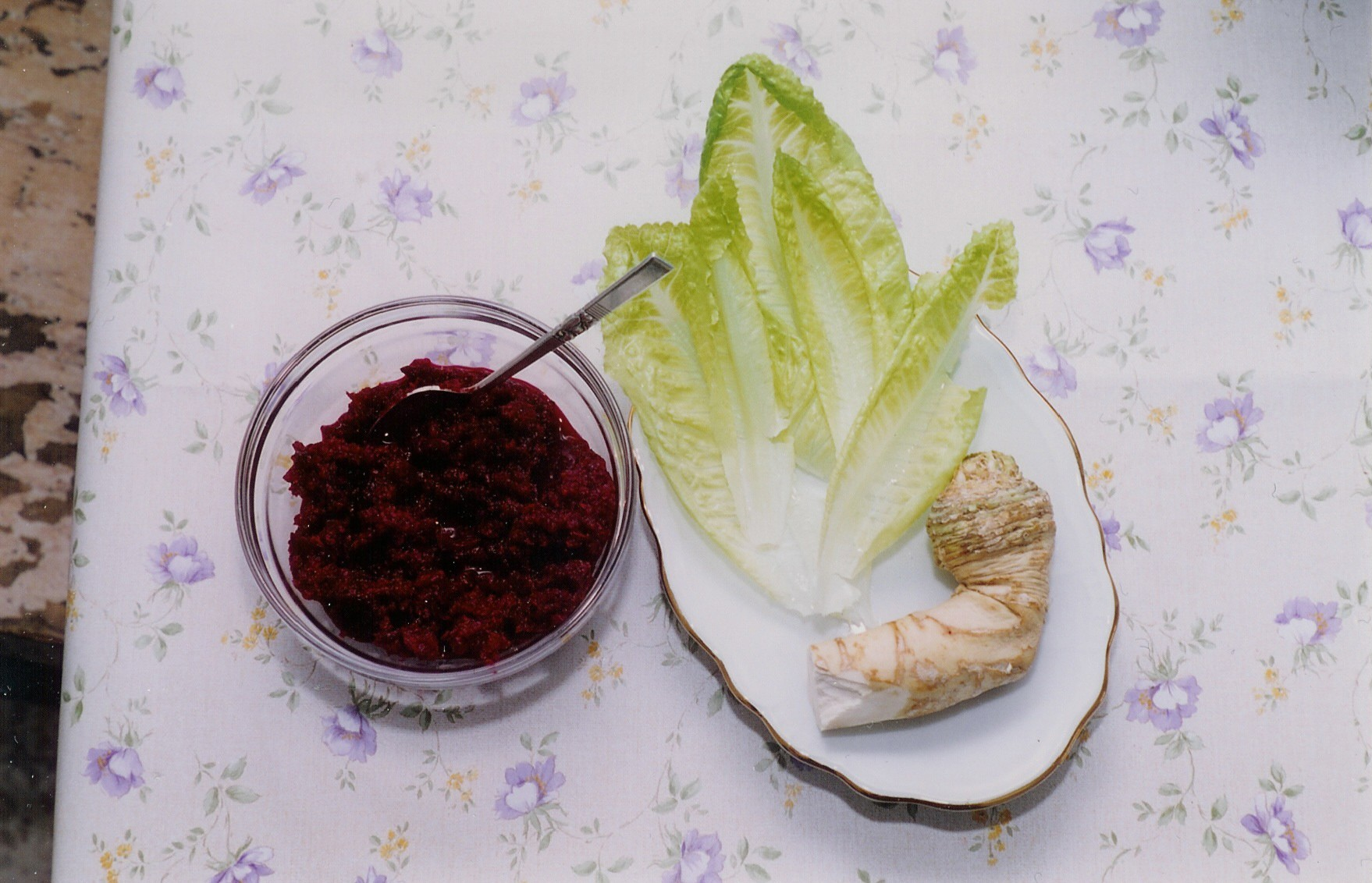
Grated horseradish mixed with cooked beets (known as chrein), romaine lettuce, and horseradish root, which should be freshly grated

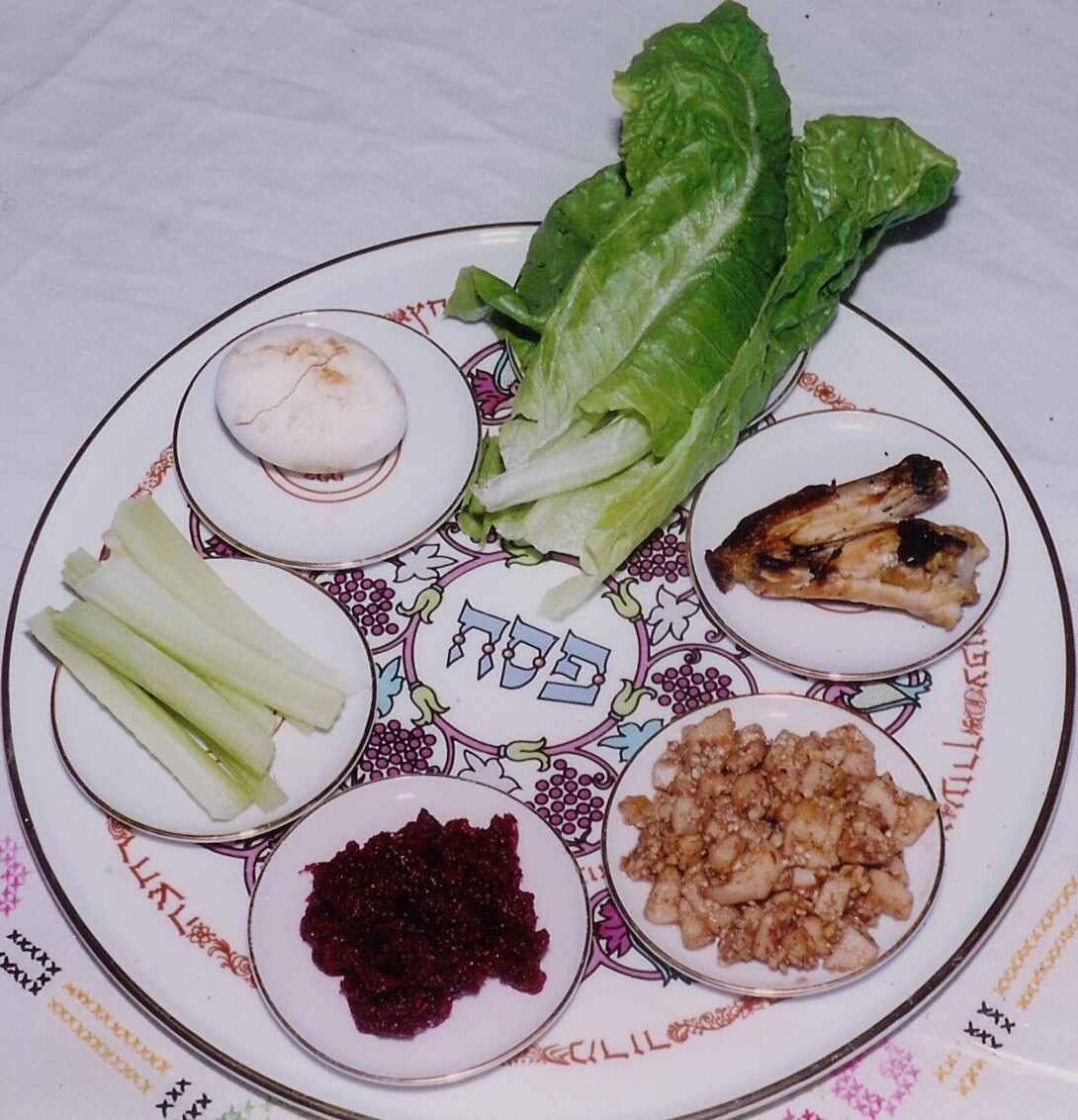
Passover Seder plate, maror on the lowest plate

Maror (Hebrew: מָרוֹר mārōr) are the bitter herbs eaten at the Passover Seder in keeping with the biblical commandment "with bitter herbs they shall eat it." (Exodus 12:8). The Maror is one of the symbolic foods placed on the Passover Seder plate.

== Biblical source ==
In some listings of the 613 commandments, such as the commentary of Joseph Babad on the Sefer ha-Chinuch, the biblical obligation to consume maror is included within the commandment to consume the meat of the Passover sacrifice.

Ever since the Paschal offering ceased to exist with the destruction of the Temple in Jerusalem in 70 CE, the obligation to consume maror on the first night of Passover has been rabbinical in nature.

The only two biblical references to the maror are the verse quoted above (Exodus 12:8) and in Numbers 9:11: "[t]hey are to eat the lamb, together with the unleavened bread and bitter herbs". This is in contradistinction to the obligation to consume matzot on the first night of Passover, which remains a biblical commandment even in the absence of the Passover lamb, because there are other biblical verses that mention matzot as a standalone obligation: Exodus 12:18 and Deuteronomy 16:8.

The word derives from the Hebrew word mar (מַר or מָרָה, "bitter"), and so may be related to the English word myrrh (through Aramaic ܡܪܝܪܐ mriro, cognate with Arabic مرّ murr).

== Symbolism ==
According to the Haggadah, the traditional text which is recited at the Seder and which defines the Seder's form and customs, the maror symbolizes the bitterness of slavery in Egypt. The following verse from the Torah underscores that symbolism: "And they embittered (ve-yimareru וימררו) their lives with hard labor, with mortar and with bricks and with all manner of labor in the field; any labor that they made them do was with hard labor" (Exodus 1:14).

== Use at the Seder ==
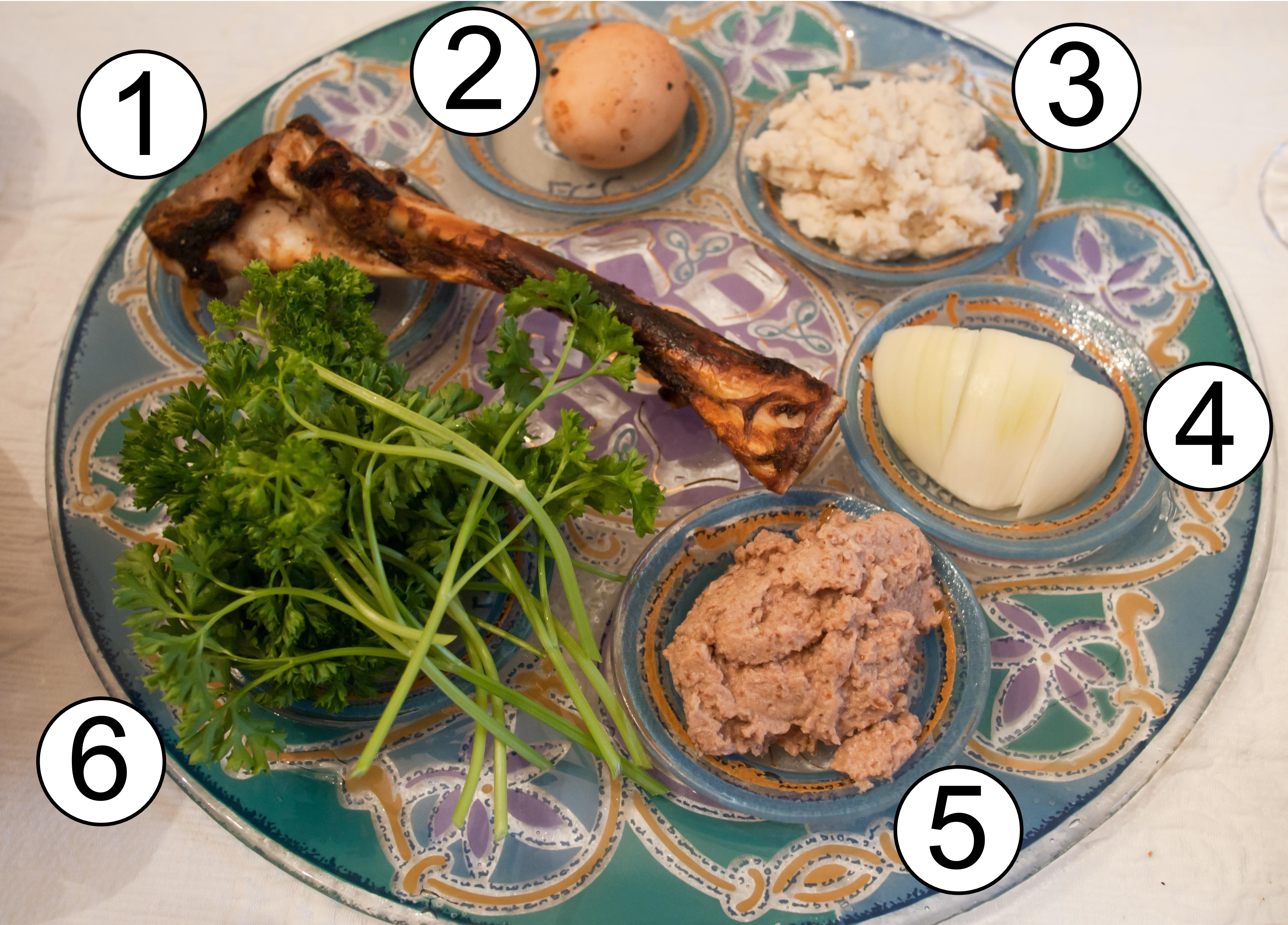
Passover Seder plate. Categories (with imaged examples in brackets): 1. Zeroa (shankbone); 2. Beitza (roasted hard-boiled egg); 3. Maror/Chazeret (horseradish); 4. Maror/Chazeret (onion); 5. Charoset; 6. Karpas (parsley)

Maror is one of the foods placed on the Passover Seder Plate and there is a rabbinical requirement to eat maror at the Seder. Chazeret (Hebrew: חזרת) is used for the requirement called Korech, in which the maror is eaten together with matzo. There are various customs about the kinds of maror placed at each location.

During the Seder, each participant recites a specific blessing over the maror and eats it. It is first dipped into the charoset— a brown, pebbly mixture which symbolizes the mortar with which the Israelites bound bricks for the Egyptians.

The halakha (Jewish law) prescribes the minimum amount of maror that should be eaten to fulfil the mitzvah (a kazayis or kezayit, literally meaning the volume of an olive) and the amount of time in which it should be consumed. To fulfil the obligation, the flavour of the maror must be unadulterated by cooking or preservatives, such as being soaked in vinegar.

== Types of maror ==
The Mishnah specifies five types of bitter herbs eaten on the night of Passover: ḥazzeret (lettuce), ʿuleshīn (endive/chicory), temakha, ḥarḥavina (possibly Melilotus or Eryngium), and maror (likely Sonchus oleraceus, the sowthistle). The most common vegetables currently used as bitter herbs are horseradish and romaine lettuce.

=== Hazzeret ===
Hazzeret is undoubtedly domestic lettuce. The word is cognate to other Near-Eastern terms for lettuce: the Talmud identifies hazzeret as hassa, similar to the Akkadian hassu.

Modern varieties of lettuce are only slightly bitter or not at all, such as iceberg lettuce and romaine lettuce. However, in the past domestic lettuce was bitter, and heirloom varieties of lettuce that are bitter are still available to gardeners. Romaine lettuce is the most commonly used variety, perhaps because it still preserves a slight bitter taste. In addition, the Talmud remarks that Romaine lettuce is not initially bitter, but becomes so later on, which is symbolic of the experience of the Jews in Egypt. The "later" bitterness of lettuce refers to the fact that lettuce plants become bitter after they "bolt" (flower), a process which occurs naturally when days lengthen or temperatures rise.

Wild or prickly lettuce (Lactuca serriola) is listed in Tosefta Pisha as suitable for maror under the name חזרת הגל or חזרת גלין. However, the absence of this plant from the approved list in the Mishnah and Talmud indicates that it should not be used ritualistically.

=== ʿUlshin ===
The second species listed in the Mishnah is ʿulshin, which is a plural to refer to both wild and cultivated types of plants in the genus Cichorium. The term is cognate to other Near Eastern terms for endives, such as Imperial Aramaic: עלת and Arabic ʿalath.

=== Tamcha ===
The Talmud Yershalmi identified Hebrew tamcha with Greek γιγγίδιον gingídion, which has been positively identified via the illustration in the Vienna Dioscurides as the wild carrot Daucus gingidium.

Rabbi Yom-Tov Lipmann Heller, in his Tosafot Yom-Tov, identified the Mishna's temakha with Yiddish chreyn (horseradish). This identification has long been recognized as problematic, as horseradish does not grow natively in Israel and was not available to Jews in the Mishnaic period.

Horseradish likely began to be used because leafy vegetables like lettuce did not grow in the northern climates Ashkenazi Jews had migrated to, and because some sources allow the use of any bitter substance (if so, the five species in the mishnah would only be illustrative examples).

Many Jews use horseradish condiment (a mixture of cooked horseradish, beetroot and sugar), though the Shulchan Aruch requires that maror be used as is, that is raw, and not cooked or mixed with salt, vinegar, sugar, lemon, or beets.

=== Harhavina ===
The identity of harhavina is somewhat disputed. It may possibly be plants of the genus Melilotus or Eryngium.

=== Maror ===
The Jews of Yemen use this name to refer to the plant Sonchus oleraceus, a relative of dandelion that is native to Israel. The word "maror" is an autohyponym, referring both to this species specifically, and to any species suitable for use at the Seder.
