= Le'Or =

American political organization

Le'Or is a 501(c)(3) organization in Portland, Oregon. It was founded in 2015 by Roy and Claire Kaufmann. The group publishes a haggadah via its website that substitutes cannabis for lettuce in the seder plate and promotes consumption of cannabis as part of the sacred rituals of Pesach (Passover). The haggadah includes the "Ten Plagues of the Drug War" and was meant to inspire discussion about the meaning of bondage in the modern age of mass incarceration and the war on drugs.
