= Romaine lettuce =

Variety of lettuce

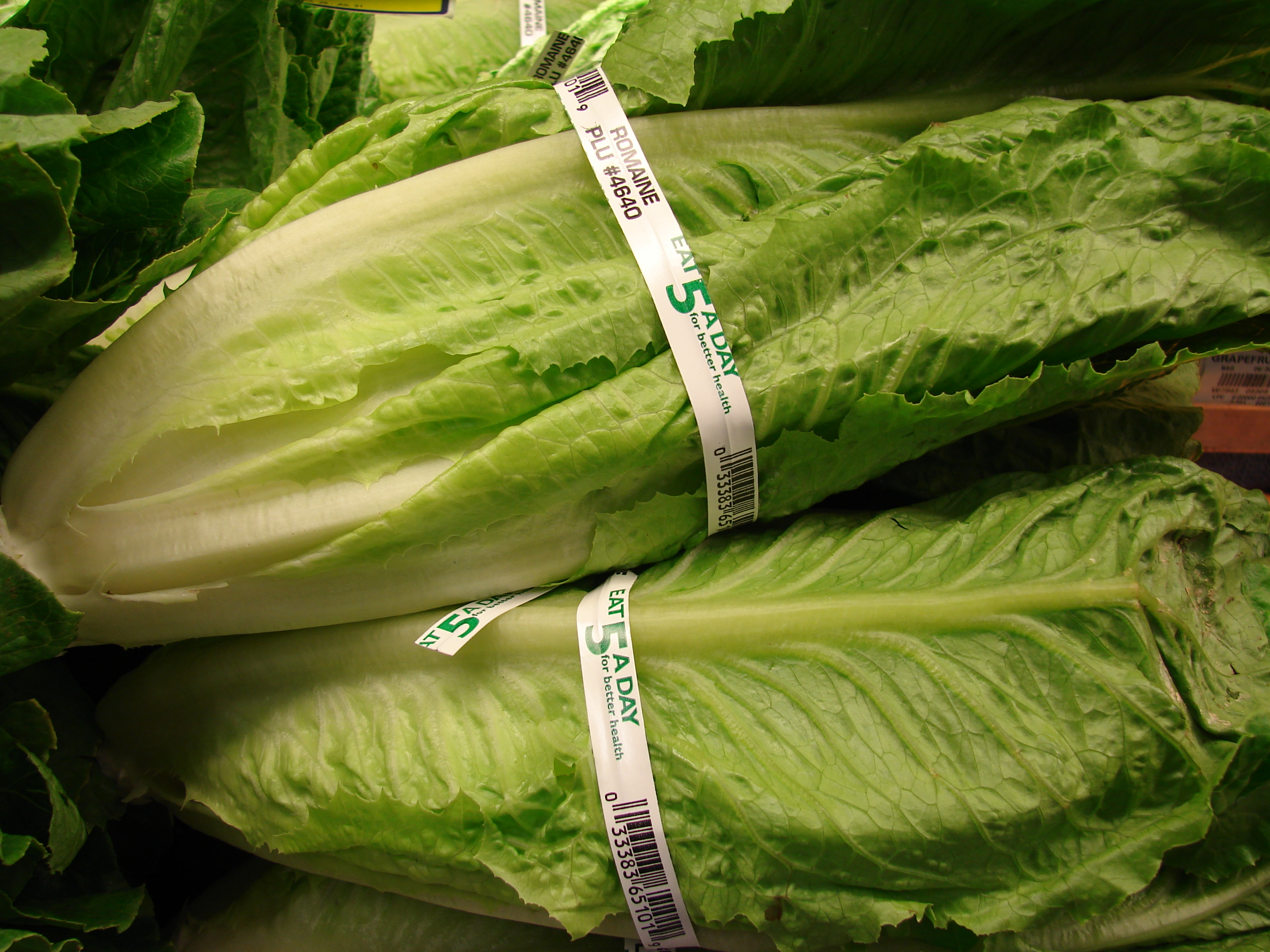
- Romaine lettuce
- Species: Lactuca sativa

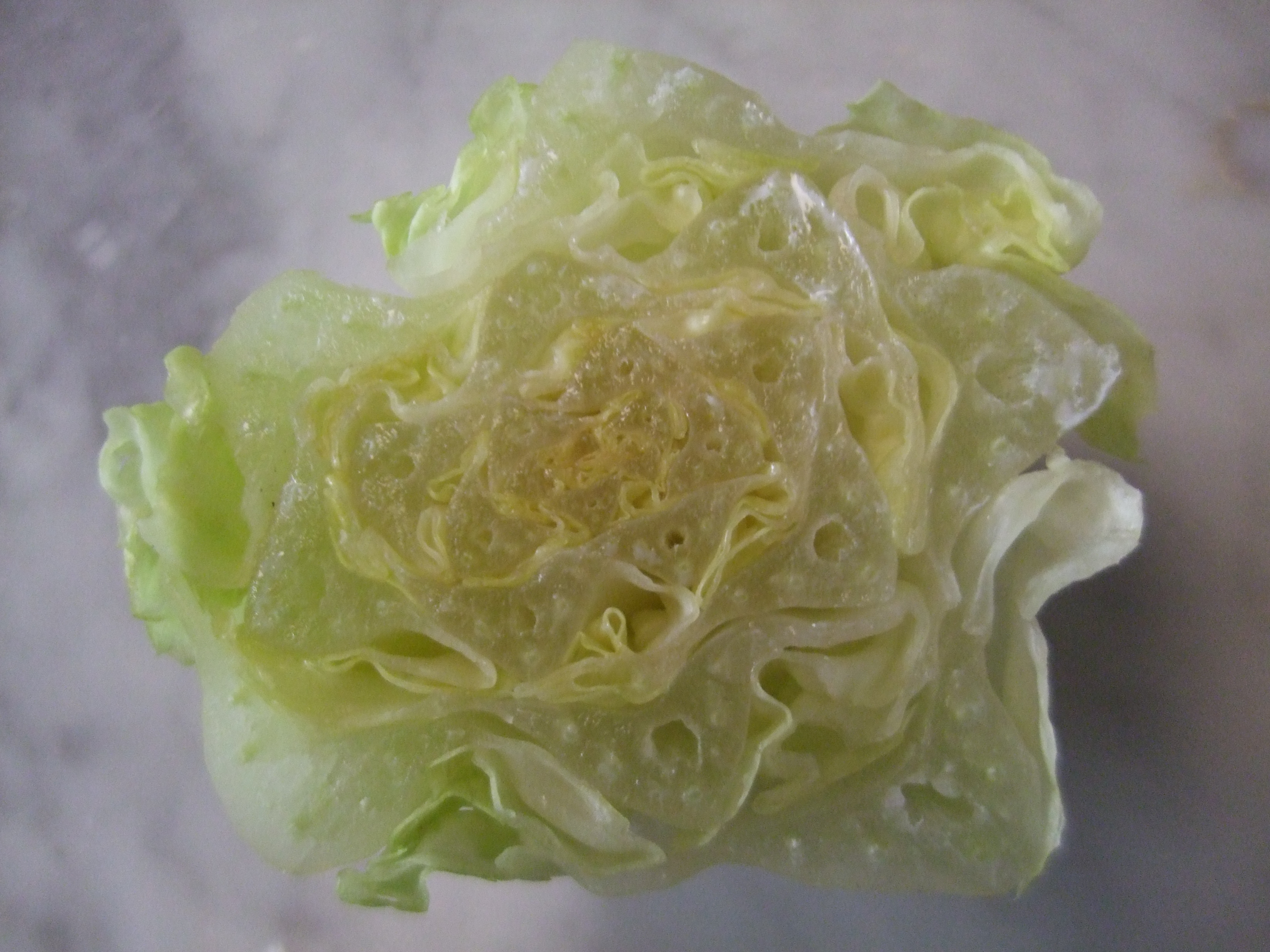
Cross-section of the heart of a romaine lettuce

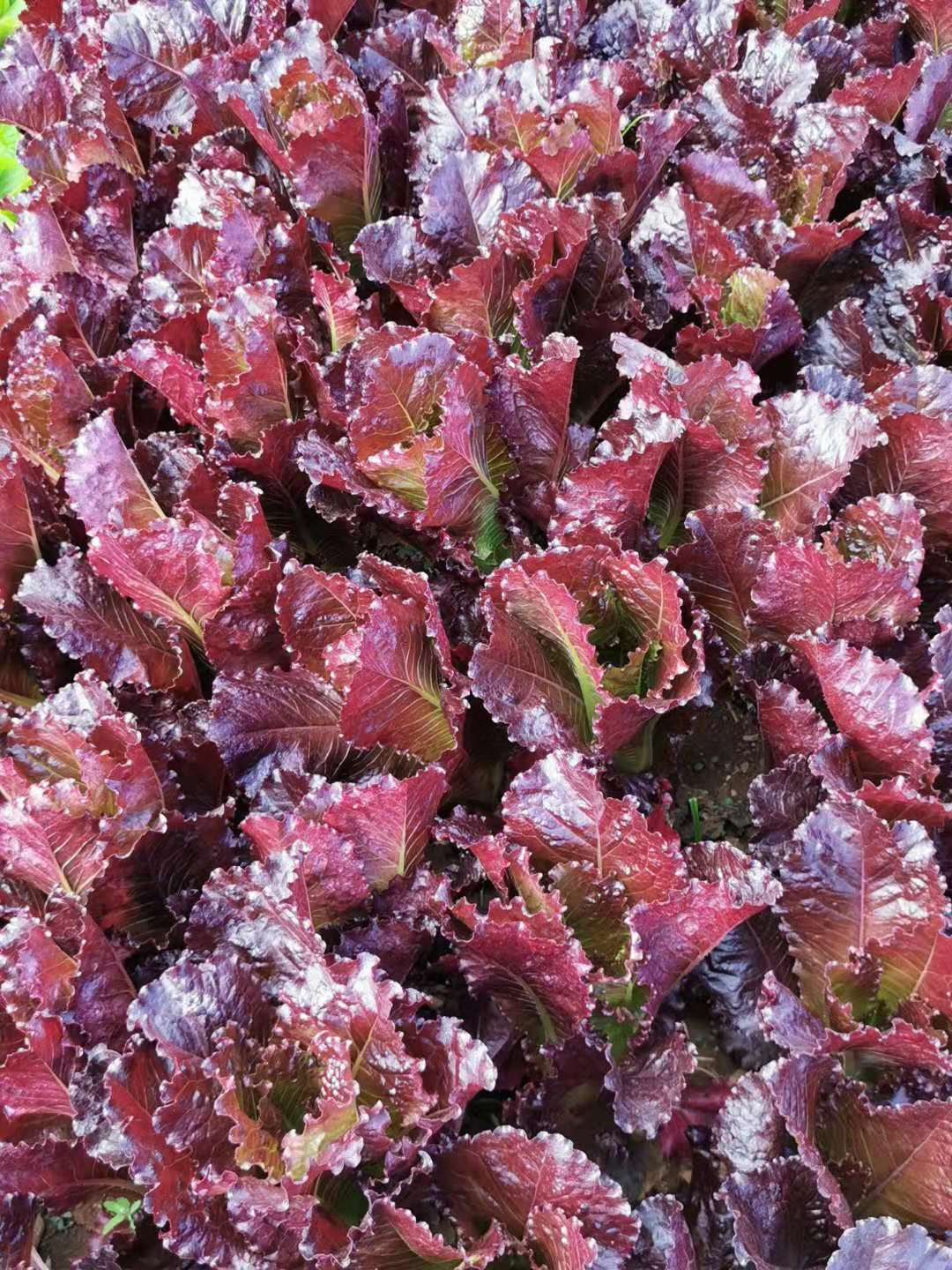
Romaine "violet"

Romaine or cos lettuce (Lactuca sativa L. var. longifolia) is a variety of lettuce that grows in a tall head of sturdy dark green leaves with firm ribs down their centers. Unlike most lettuces, it is tolerant of heat. In North America, romaine is often sold as whole heads or as "hearts" that have had the outer leaves removed and are often packaged together.

Commercially sold romaine lettuce has occasionally been the subject of product warnings by both U.S. and Canadian health authorities warning that consumer supplies can become contaminated with or host pathogenic E. coli bacteria. Cattle can harbor the bacteria without ill effects and be asymptomatic carriers of the bacterium. Lettuce becomes contaminated with the bacterium as the result of cattle manure being used to fertilize crop fields, or the proximity of cattle pastures and feedlots to water sources used to irrigate crops.

== Origin and etymology ==
In North American English it is known as "romaine" lettuce, and in British English the name "cos" lettuce is predominantly used but "romaine" lettuce is sometimes found. Many dictionaries trace the word cos to the name of the Greek island of Cos, from which the lettuce was presumably introduced. Other authorities trace cos to the Arabic word for lettuce, khus خس [xus]. The first mention of cos lettuce in English dates from the late 17th century in John Evelyn's 1699 work Acetaria: A Discourse of Sallets.

The lettuce apparently reached Western Europe via Rome, as it is called lattuga romana in Italian and laitue romaine in French, both meaning "Roman lettuce," hence the name "romaine", the common term in North America.

== Cultural significance ==
For 3,000 years (from at least 2,700 BC), lettuce was associated with the ancient Egyptian god of fertility, Min, for its resemblance to the phallus.

Romaine lettuce may be used in the Passover Seder ritual feast as a type of bitter herb. It symbolises the bitterness inflicted by the Egyptians while the Israelites were slaves in Egypt.

The day of 22 Germinal in the French Republican Calendar was dedicated to romaine lettuce, as "Romaine".

== Cuisine ==
Romaine is a common salad green and is the typical lettuce used in Caesar salad. Romaine lettuce is commonly used in Middle Eastern cuisine. Romaine, like other lettuces, may also be cooked. For example, it can be braised or made into soup. The thick ribs, especially on the older outer leaves, have a milky fluid that gives the romaine its typically bitter herb taste.

== Food safety issues ==
From November 2017 to January 2018, the Public Health Agency of Canada (PHA) identified romaine as being linked to illness in 41 persons in Canada. A probably related outbreak affected 25 people in 15 states of the U.S. who ate leafy greens, but the U.S. Centers for Disease Control (CDC) were unable to confirm that it was romaine in particular. There was one death. The disease agent was Shiga toxin-producing E. coli O157:H7. The most recent illness started on December 12, 2017; the PHA declared the outbreak over on January 10, 2018, and the CDC declared it over on January 25.

In response to another E. coli O157:H7 outbreak, which probably began in mid-March 2018, the CDC recommended in April 2018 that consumers not buy or eat romaine lettuce unless they could confirm it was not from the Yuma, Arizona, growing region. On May 22, 2018, after a month-long warning, the CDC announced it was now safe to consume romaine again. The outbreak killed five people and caused 89 hospitalizations across 32 states. In June 2018, the Food and Drug Administration (FDA) traced the source of the latest E. coli outbreak to water from a canal located in Yuma, Arizona.

In November 2018, the CDC and PHA issued a warning to consumers that romaine lettuce should not be consumed in any form, and that they should dispose of any currently on hand. The same strain of E. coli identified in the 2017-2018 outbreak was implicated. At least 43 people became ill in this outbreak, which the FDA traced to one of six counties in central California: Monterey, San Benito, San Luis Obispo, Santa Barbara, Santa Cruz and Ventura.

== Growers ==
In North American supermarkets, romaine is widely available year-round. Many US growers of romaine lettuce farm in Salinas, California, in the summer and the Imperial Valley and Yuma, Arizona, in the winter, relying on day laborers crossing the border from Mexico. Much of the romaine lettuce sold in northern Europe is grown in southern Spain, relying on migrant laborers from Africa.
