= Zeroa =

Shankbone on Passover Seder plate

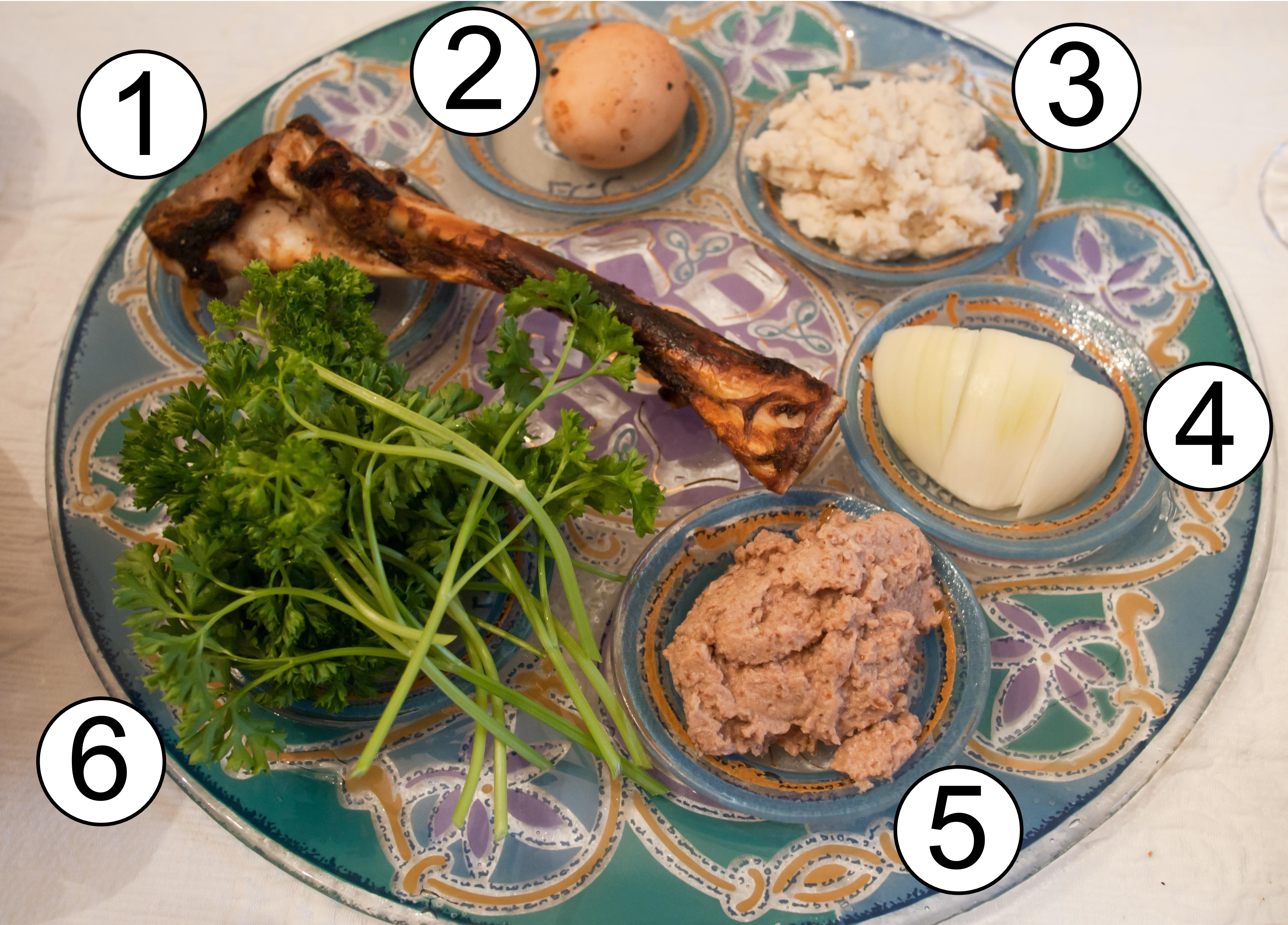
Passover Seder plate. Categories (with imaged examples in brackets): 1. Zeroa (shankbone); 2. Beitza (roasted hard-boiled egg); 3. Maror/Chazeret (horseradish); 4. Maror/Chazeret (onion); 5. Charoset; 6. Karpas (parsley)

Zeroa (Hebrew: זרוֹע) is a lamb shank bone or roast chicken wing or neck used on Passover and placed on the Seder plate. It symbolizes the korban Pesach (Pesach sacrifice), a lamb that was offered in the Temple in Jerusalem, then roasted (70 CE) during the destruction of the Temple, the z'roa serves as a visual reminder of the Pesach sacrifice. In Ashkenazi and many Sephardi families, it is not eaten or handled during the Seder, as it represents a sacrifice made at the Temple, but is not actually, making it taboo to eat. Vegetarians often substitute a beet, quoting Pesachim 114b as justification.

== History ==
The origin of the custom comes from the Gemara in the tractate Pesachim of the Babylonian Talmud and the Jerusalem Talmud, which discuss the question of what are those two dishes that the Mishnah says one must bring to the Seder night. According to the Gemara, the two dishes are the Zeroa of the Passover sacrifice and an Beitza (egg) as a symbol of the Chagigah offering.
