= Passover Seder plate =

Plate displaying symbolic foods of Passover seder

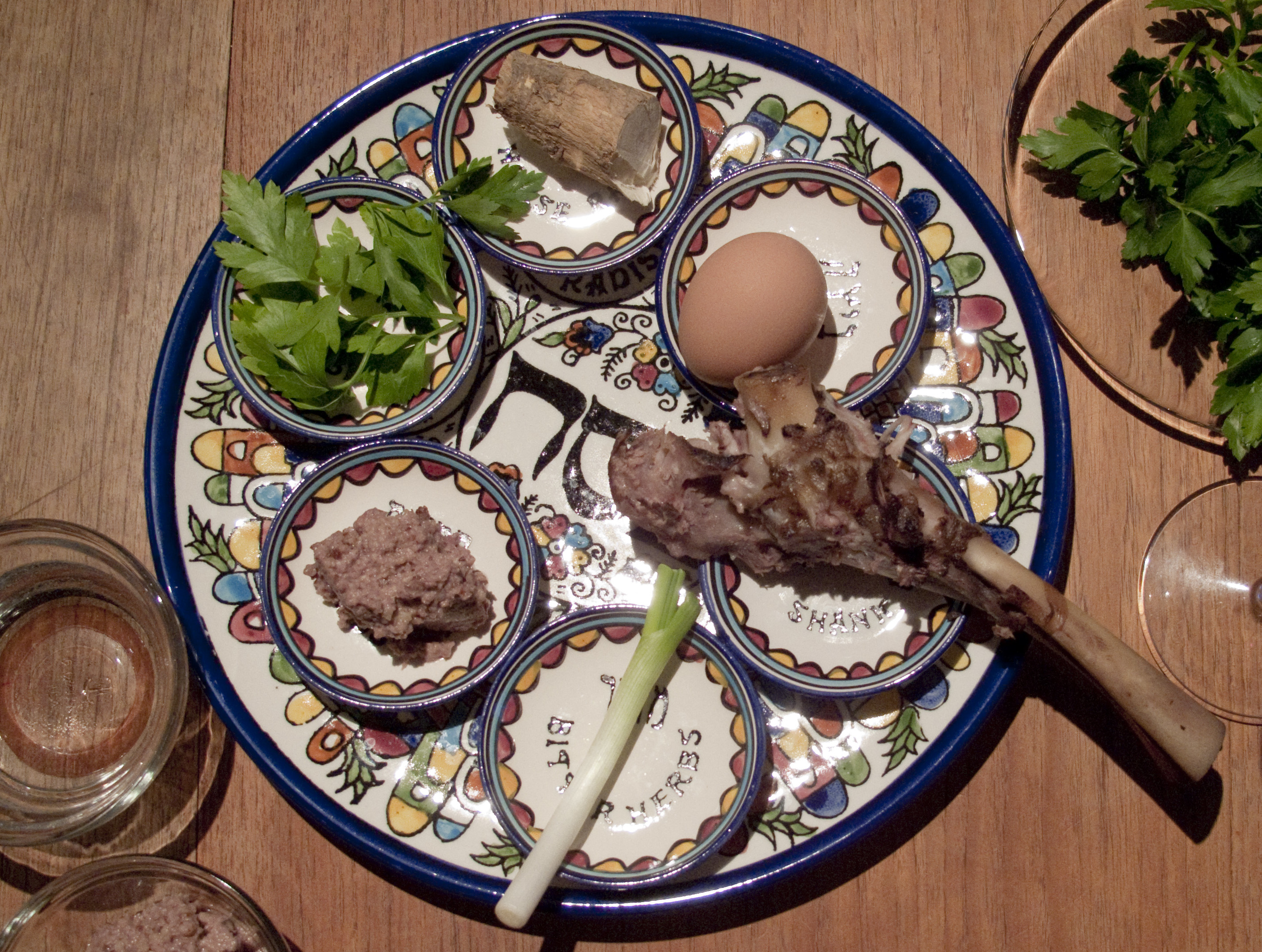
Passover Seder plate

The Passover Seder plate (Hebrew: קערה, ke'ara) is a special plate containing symbolic foods eaten or displayed at the Passover Seder. It is used to show all the symbolic foods that are used for the Passover Seder.

== Symbolic foods ==
Each of the six items arranged on the plate has special significance to the retelling of the story of Passover—the exodus from Egypt—which is the focus of this ritual meal. A seventh symbolic item used during the meal—the three matzos—is not considered part of the seder plate proper.

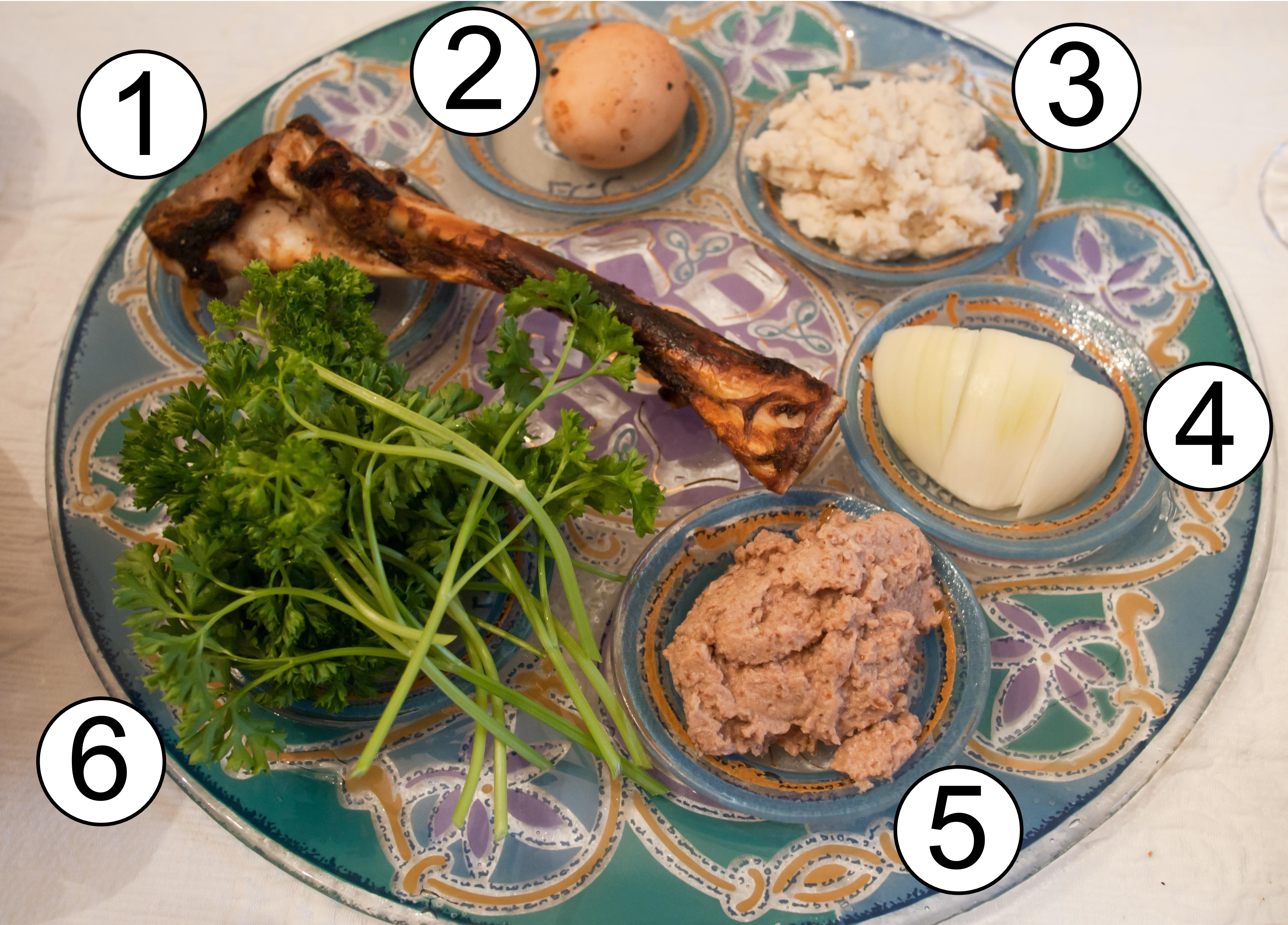
Passover Seder plate. Categories (with imaged examples in brackets): 1. Zeroa (shankbone); 2. Beitza (roasted hard-boiled egg); 3. Maror/Chazeret (horseradish); 4. Maror/Chazeret (onion); 5. Charoset; 6. Karpas (parsley)

The six traditional items on the Seder Plate are:

=== Maror and Chazeret ===
Maror and Chazeret – Bitter herbs symbolizing the bitterness and harshness of the slavery that the Hebrews endured in Egypt. In Ashkenazi tradition, fresh romaine lettuce or endives (both representing the bitterness of the Roman invasions) or chazeret (horseradish) may be eaten as Maror in the fulfillment of the mitzvah of eating bitter herbs during the Seder. Chazeret are additional bitter herbs, usually romaine lettuce, that are used in the korech sandwich.

=== Charoset ===
Charoset – A sweet, brown mixture representing the mortar and brick used by the Hebrew slaves to build the structures of Egypt. In Ashkenazi Jewish homes, Charoset is traditionally made from chopped nuts, grated apples, cinnamon, and sweet red wine.

=== Karpas ===
Karpas – A vegetable parsley or other non-bitter herbs representing hope and renewal, which is dipped into salt water or vinegar at the beginning of the Seder. Some substitute parsley with a slice of green onion (representing the bitterness of slavery in Egypt) or potato (representing the bitterness of the ghetto in Germany and in other European countries), both commonly used. Participants dip a simple vegetable into salt water. Water then drips off the vegetables visually representing tears and is a symbolic reminder of the pain felt by the Hebrew slaves in Egypt. Usually, in a Shabbat or holiday meal, the first thing to be eaten after the kiddush over wine is bread. At the Seder table, however, the first thing to be eaten after the kiddush is a vegetable. This leads immediately to the recital of the famous question, Ma Nishtana—"Why is this night different from all other nights?" It also symbolizes the springtime, because Jews celebrate Passover in the spring.

=== Zeroah ===
Zeroa – Also transliterated Z'roa, this is typically a roasted lamb shank bone or chicken wing. It is special as it is the only element of meat on the Seder Plate, symbolizing the Korban Pesach (Passover sacrifice), or Pascal Lamb. It symbolizes the sacrifice of a lamb whose blood was painted on the doorway of Israelite slaves' houses so that the angel of death would pass over that house during the tenth plague.

=== Beitza ===
Beitza – A hard-boiled egg, symbolizing the korban chagigah (festival sacrifice) that was offered at the Temple in Jerusalem, is then roasted and eaten as part of the meal on Seder night. Although both the Pesach sacrifice and the chagigah were meat offerings, the chagigah is commemorated by an egg, a symbol of mourning (as eggs are the first thing served to mourners after a funeral), evoking the idea of mourning over the destruction of the Temple and the inability to offer the biblically mandated sacrifices for the Pesach holiday. The use of an egg in the seder is first attested in the 16th-century Shulchan Aruch commentary of Rabbi Moses Isserles, and it is not known when the custom began. It is not used during the formal part of the seder. Some people eat a regular hard-boiled egg dipped in salt water or vinegar as part of the first course of the meal, or as an appetizer. The egg also represents the circle of life: birth, reproduction, and death.

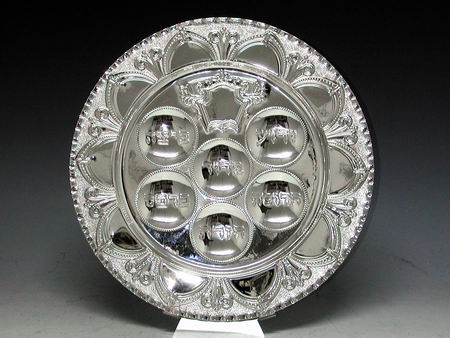
Sterling silver seder plate

Many decorative and artistic Seder plates sold in Judaica stores have pre-formed spaces for inserting the various symbolic foods.

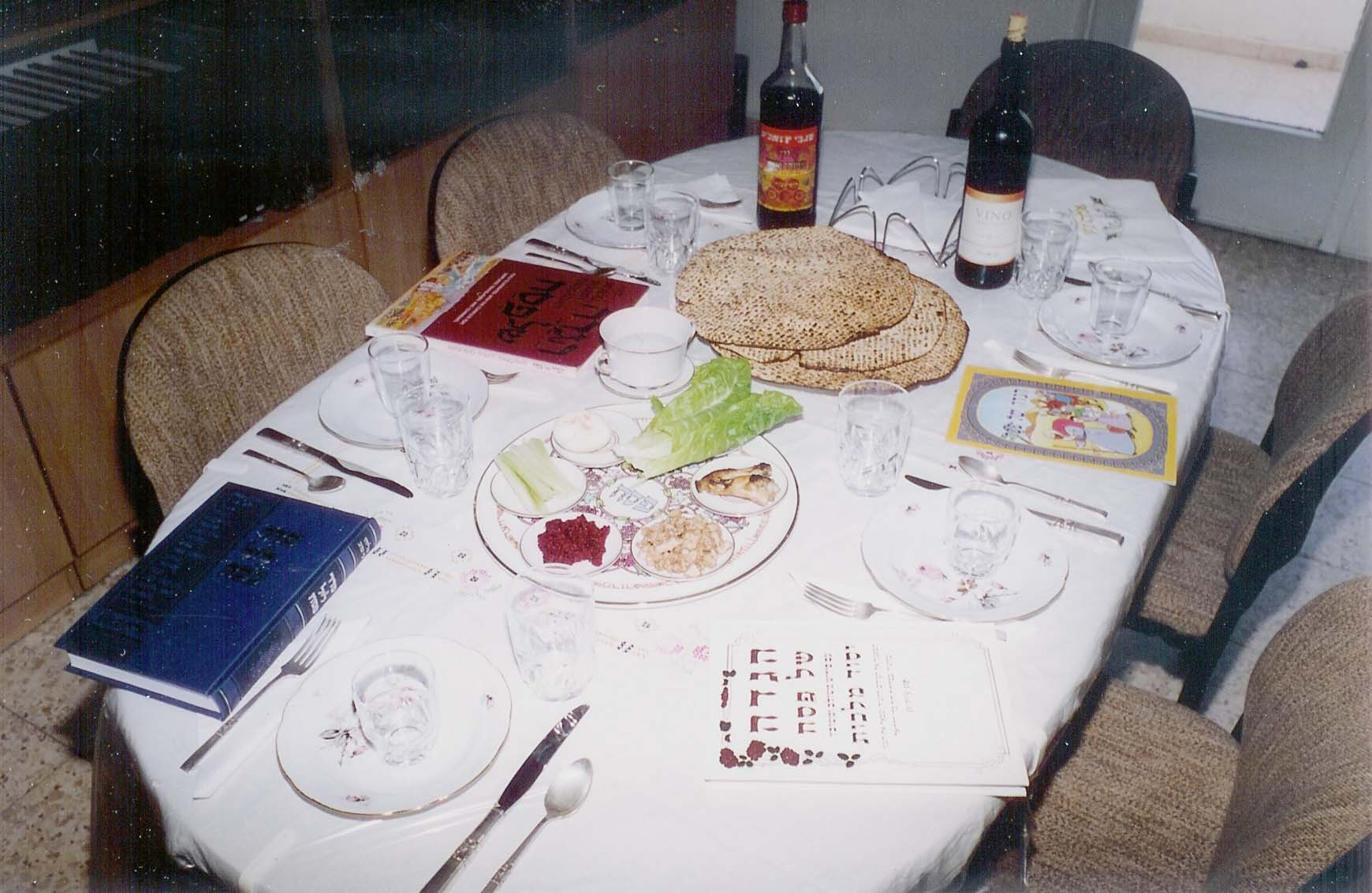
Table set for the seder with a seder plate, salt water, matza, kosher wine and a copy of the Haggadah for each guest

=== Three matzot ===
The sixth symbolic item on the Seder table is a plate of three whole matzot, which are stacked and separated from each other by cloths or napkins. The middle matzah will be broken and half of it put aside for the afikoman. The top and another half of the middle matzot will be used for the hamotzi (blessing over bread), and the bottom matzah will be used for the korech (Hillel sandwich).

According to one common interpretation, the three matzot represent "Kohen, Levi and Yisrael" (i.e., the priests, the tribe of Levi, and all other Jewish people).

=== Salt water or vinegar ===
Most Ashkenazi Jews add a bowl of salt water, which is used for the first "dipping" of the Seder but is not traditionally part of the Seder Plate but is sometimes placed beside the plate or used as one of the six items, omitting chazeret. The salt water represents the tears of the Israelites when they were enslaved. Sephardic and Persian Jews, as well as German Jews, include vinegar, rather than salt water, on the seder plate, and dipped karpas in the vinegar rather than in salt water.

== Additional or alternative items ==
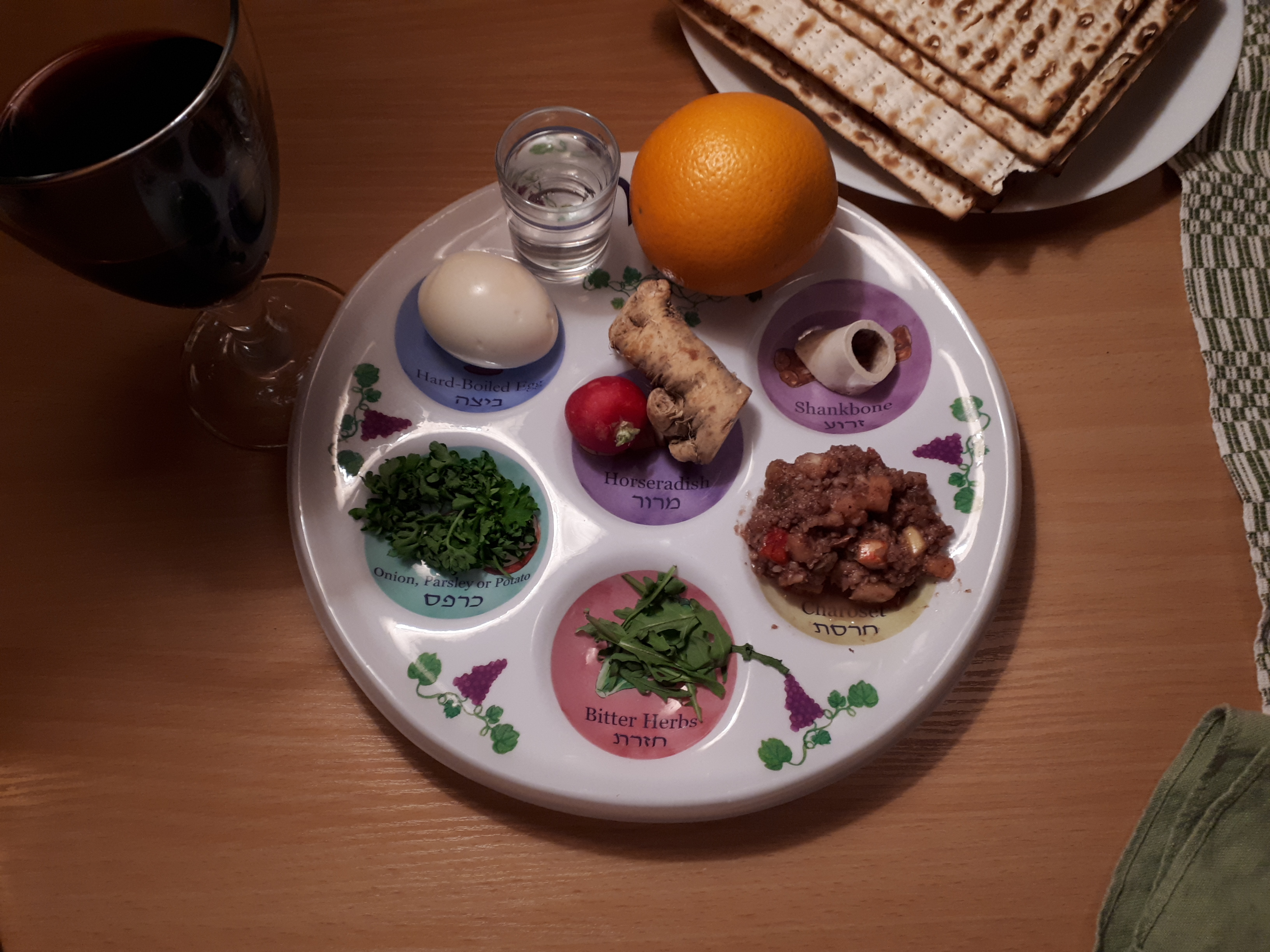
Passover Seder plate including an orange.

In modern times, several additional items have been proposed as additions to the seder plate.

One of the oldest of these proposed items, dating back to the 1980s, is the orange, which represents the fruitfulness for all Jews when marginalized Jews, particularly women and gay people, are allowed to become active and contribute to the Jewish community, as suggested by Susannah Heschel, when she spoke at Hillel at Oberlin College, and saw an early feminist haggadah that included Susan Fielding's short story about a young Jewish lesbian told by her Hasidic rebbe that "there is as much place for a lesbian in Judaism as there is for hametz at the seder table." Heschel felt, as did those women at Oberlin, that putting bread on the Seder plate would mean accepting the idea that lesbian and gay Jews are as incompatible with Judaism as chametz is with Passover. At her next Seder, she used an orange as a symbol of inclusion for lesbians, gays, and others who are marginalized by the Jewish community. Participants eat a segment of the orange, spitting out the seeds as a symbol of rejecting homophobia.

In the 21st-century, some have suggested other items, such as olives (as a call for peace between Israel and Palestine), lemons (to support the return of Israeli hostages in Gaza) and fair trade chocolate or cocoa beans (linking the Exodus story to the reality of modern forced labor).

== See also ==
- Jewish ceremonial art
- Haft-sin, a similar display for Nowruz, the Iranian new year
- Twelve-dish Christmas Eve supper
