= Karpas =

One of the traditional rituals in the Passover Seder

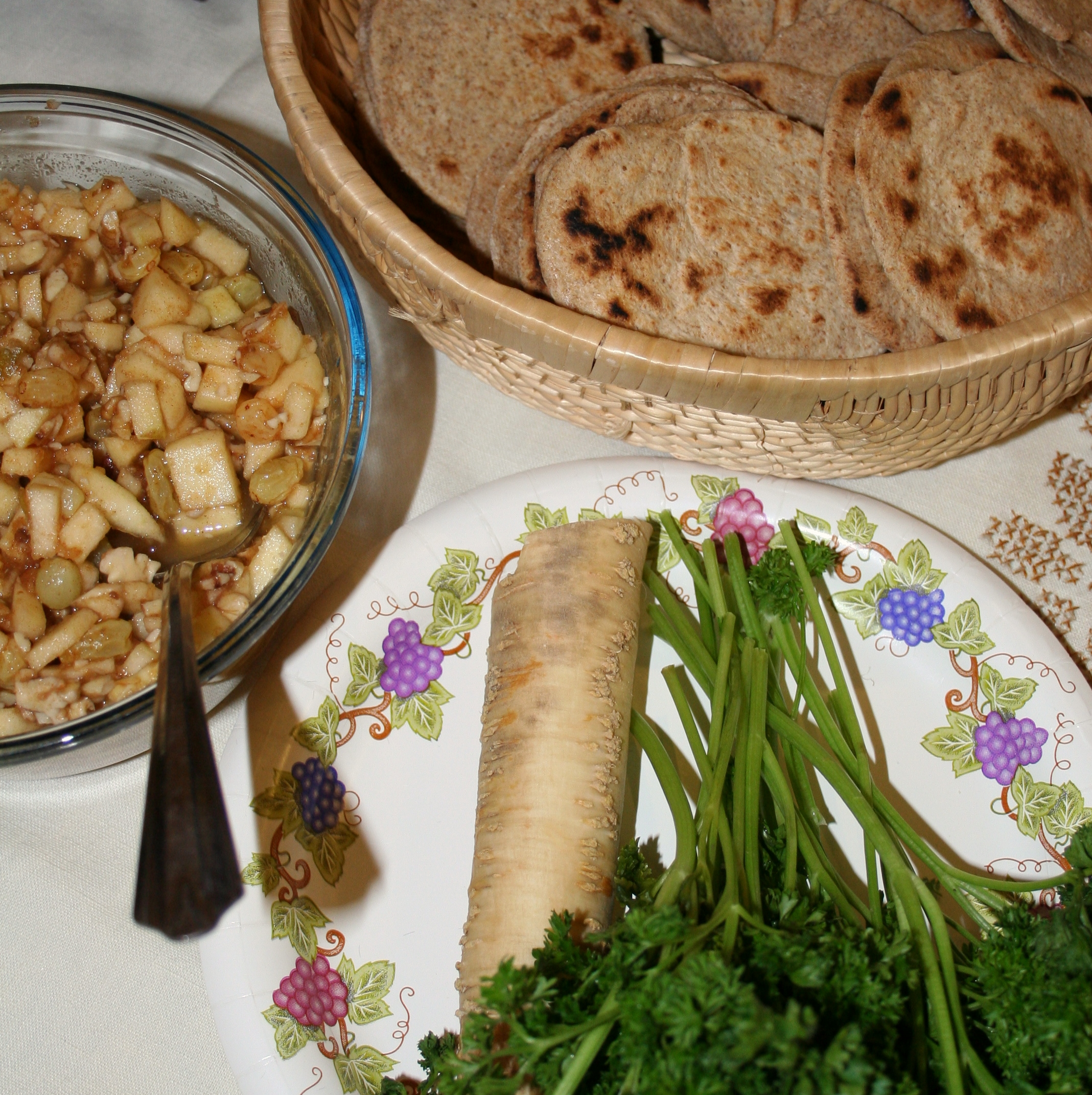
Karpas (here parsley), on a Seder table, along with matzo (unleavened bread), maror (bitter herbs, here horseradish) and charoset

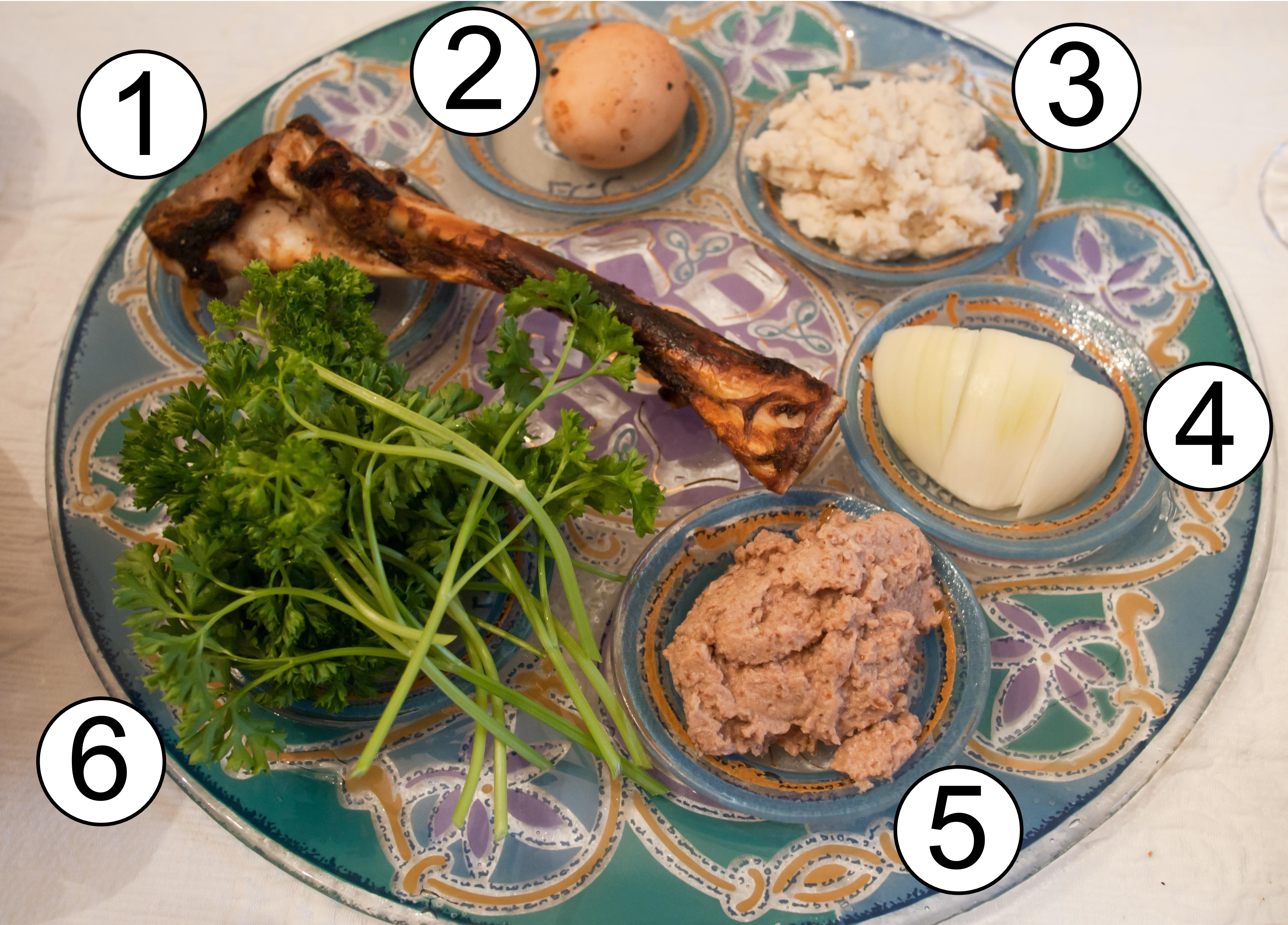
Passover Seder plate. Categories (with imaged examples in brackets): 1. Zeroa (shankbone); 2. Beitza (roasted hard-boiled egg); 3. Maror/Chazeret (horseradish); 4. Maror/Chazeret (onion); 5. Charoset; 6. Karpas (parsley)

Karpas (Hebrew: כַּרְפַּס) is one of the traditional rituals in the Passover Seder. It refers to either parsley or celery, that is dipped in liquid and eaten. The karpas is traditionally placed on the seder plate on the left side, below the roasted egg.

The word karpas is the original Hebrew word for "celery", borrowed from Persian word karafs (Persian: کرفس) meaning celery. The word was originally pronounced karafs; the standard modern pronunciation "karpas" may be a linguistic corruption which developed due to a misvocalization along the lines of a similar word found in Esther 1:6 which means cotton.

One reason given for dipping a vegetable into a liquid is to encourage children to ask about it, as per the theme of the Seder night that the story is to be recounted by way of question and answer. Dipping a vegetable prior to the main meal is not usually done at other occasions, and thus arouses the curiosity of the children. There is a second ceremonial dipping later in the Seder, when maror is dipped into the charoset. Hence one of the Four Questions, traditionally sung by the youngest at the Seder table, asks why "on all other nights we do not dip vegetables even once, on this night, we dip twice."

Some have explained the dipping of the Karpas into salt water to symbolize Joseph's tunic being dipped into blood by his brothers. Karpas is therefore done at the beginning of the seder, just as Joseph's tunic being dipped into blood began the Israelite descent to Egypt. The second dipping some say reminds us of the dipping of hyssop into lambs blood and painted on the doorposts so the angel of death would pass over that house.
