= Passover Seder =

Ritual feast that marks the beginning of Passover

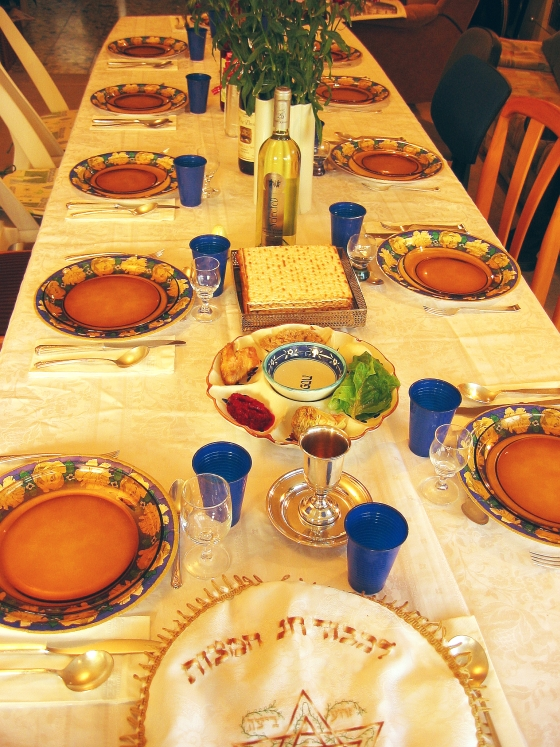
- Table set for the Passover Seder
- Observed by: Jews, Samaritans, other groups claiming affiliation with Israelites
- Type: Religious, cultural
- Significance: To retell the story of the Exodus from Egypt
- Celebrations: In Jewish practice, one or two festive Seder meals on the first two nights
- Date: 14th day of Nisan
- 2025 date: Evening, 12 April
- 2026 date: Evening, 1 April
- 2027 date: Evening, 21 April
- 2028 date: Evening, 10 April
- Related to: Three Pilgrimage Festivals (particularly Shavuot which follows 49 days from the second night of Passover)

The Passover Seder (Note: /ˈseɪdər/; Hebrew: סדר פסח [ˈseder ˈpesaχ], 'Passover order/arrangement'; Yiddish: סדר [ˈseider]) is a ritual feast at the beginning of the Jewish holiday of Passover. It is conducted throughout the world at the start of the 15th day of Nisan in the Hebrew calendar (at sunset, when a Hebrew day begins). The day falls in late March or in April of the Gregorian calendar. Passover lasts for seven days in Israel, and customarily eight days in the Jewish diaspora. A seder is held on the first night, the 15th of Nisan; where eight days are observed; a seder is also held on the second night.

The Seder is a ritual involving a retelling of the story of the liberation of the Israelites from slavery in ancient Egypt, taken from the Book of Exodus (Shemot) in the Torah, the Jewish holy book. The Seder itself is based on the Biblical verse commanding Jews to retell the story of the Exodus from Egypt: "You shall tell your child on that day, saying, 'It is because of what the LORD did for me when I came out of Egypt.'" (Exodus 13:8) At the seder, Jews read the text of the Haggadah, an ancient Tannaitic work narrating the Israelite exodus from Egypt, with special blessings and rituals, Talmudic commentaries, and Passover songs.

Seder customs include telling and discussing the story, drinking four cups of wine, eating matzah, partaking of symbolic foods, and reclining in celebration of freedom. The Seder is one of the most celebrated Jewish rituals, performed by Jews all over the world.

== Etymology ==
Seder is a transliteration of the Hebrew סדר, which means 'order' or 'procedure'. The name also expresses the conduct of the meal, all the dishes, the blessings, the prayers, the stories and the songs, written in the Haggadah, a book that determines the order of Passover and tells the story of the Exodus from Egypt. And all the mitzvot (religious commandments or rites) in the "order" are done in a fixed order in every Jewish home.

== Overview ==
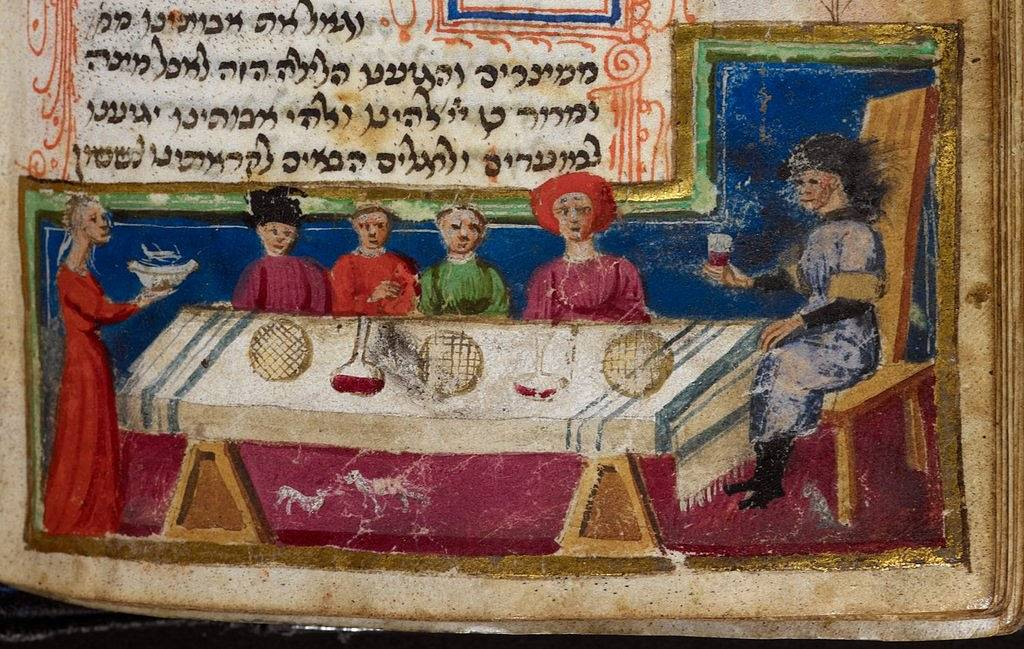
Forli Siddur, 1383, British Library

The Seder is most often conducted in the family home, although communal Seders are also organized by synagogues, schools and community centers, some open to the general public. It is customary to invite guests, especially strangers and the needy. The Seder is integral to Jewish faith and identity: as explained in the Haggadah, if not for divine intervention and the Exodus, the Jewish people would still be slaves in Egypt. Therefore, the Seder is an occasion for praise and thanksgiving and for re-dedication to the idea of liberation. Furthermore, the words and rituals of the Seder are a primary vehicle for the transmission of the Jewish faith from grandparent to child, and from one generation to the next. Attending a Seder and eating matzah on Passover is a widespread custom even among those who are not religiously observant.

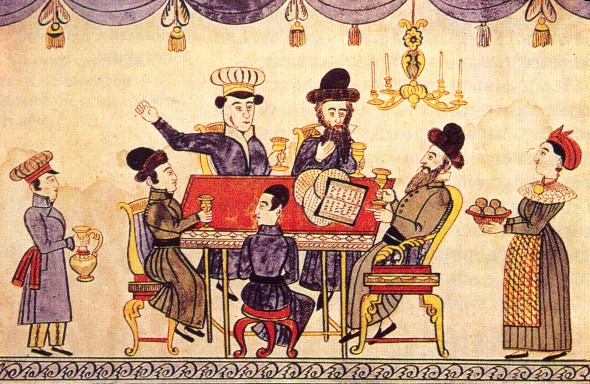
A Ukrainian 19th-century lubok representing the Seder table

Family members come to the table dressed in their holiday clothes. There is an Orthodox Ashkenazi tradition for the person leading the Seder to wear a white robe called a kittel. For the first half of the Seder, each participant will only need a plate and a wine glass. At the head of the table is a Seder plate containing various symbolic foods that will be eaten or pointed out during the course of the Seder. Placed nearby is a plate with three matzot and dishes of salt water for dipping.

Each participant receives a copy of the Haggadah: an ancient text that contains the complete Seder service. Men and women are equally obliged and eligible to participate in the Seder. Traditionally, each participant at the Seder table recites the Haggadah in the original Hebrew and Aramaic. Halakha requires that certain parts be said in language the participants can understand, and critical parts are often said in both Hebrew and the native language. The leader will often interrupt the reading to discuss different points with his or her children, or to offer an insight into the meaning or interpretation of the words.

In some homes, participants take turns reciting the text of the Haggadah, in the original Hebrew or in translation. It is traditional for the head of the household and other participants to have pillows placed behind them for added comfort. At several points during the Seder, participants lean to the left – when drinking the four cups of wine, eating the Afikoman, and eating the korech sandwich.

Jews generally observe one or two seders: in Israel, one seder is observed on the first night of Passover; traditional Diaspora communities (to the general exception of Reform and Reconstructionist Jews) also hold a seder on the second night. Seders have been observed around the world, including in remote places such as high in the Himalaya mountains in Kathmandu, Nepal.

== Themes ==
=== Slavery and freedom ===
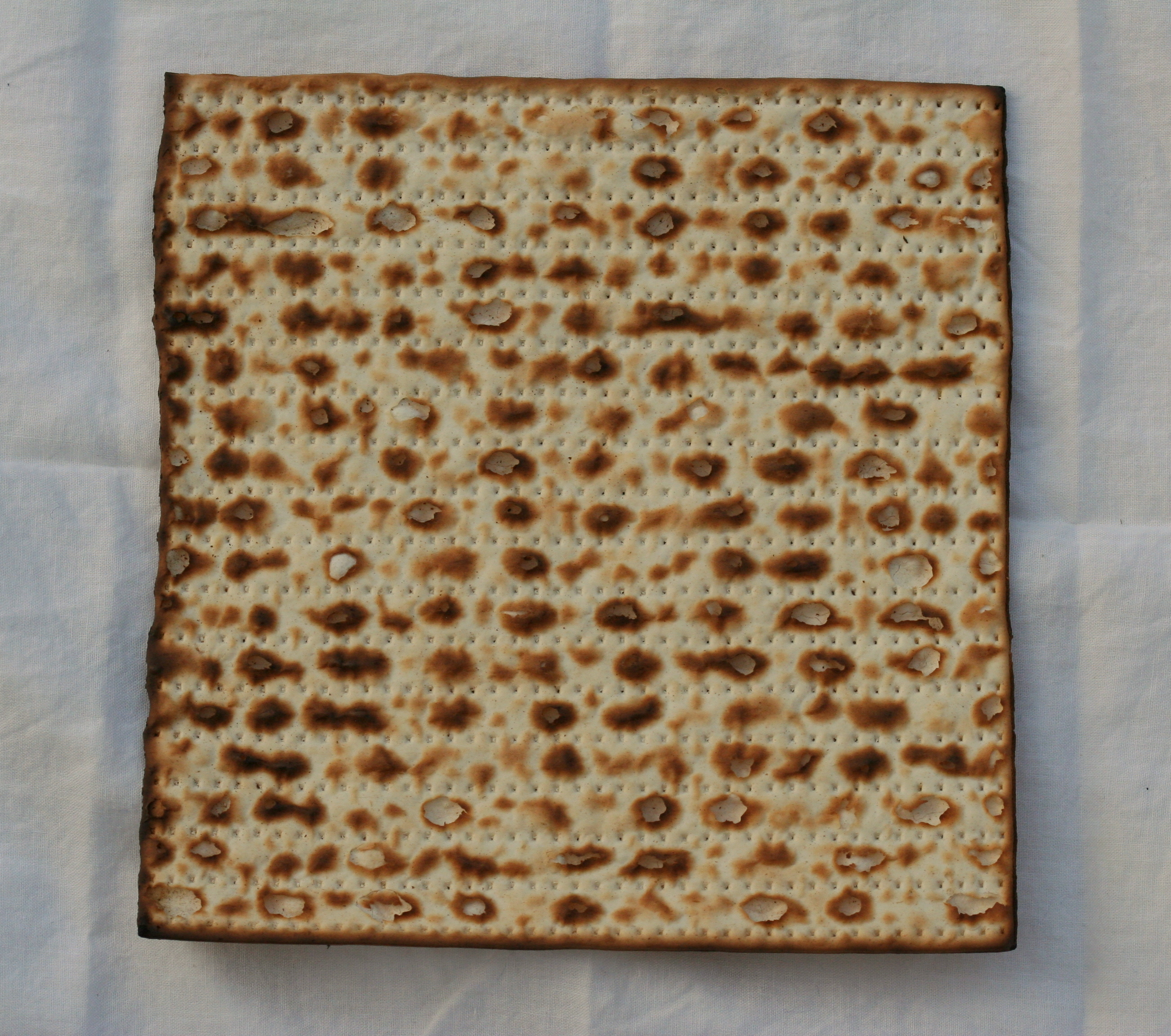
Machine-made matzo

The rituals and symbolic foods evoke the twin themes of the evening: slavery and freedom. It is stated in the Haggadah that "In every generation everyone is obligated to see themselves as if they themselves came out of Egypt" – i.e., out of slavery.

The rendering of time for Jews is that a day began at sunset and ended at sunset. According to the Exodus narrative, at the beginning of the 15th of Nisan in Ancient Egypt, the Jewish people were enslaved to Pharaoh. After the tenth plague struck Egypt at midnight, killing all the first-born sons from the first-born of Pharaoh to the first-born of the lowest Egyptian to all the first-born of the livestock in the land (Exodus 12:29), Pharaoh let the Hebrew nation go, effectively making them free people for the second half of the night.

Thus, Seder participants recall the slavery that reigned during the first half of the night by eating matzah (the "poor person's bread"), maror (bitter herbs which symbolize the bitterness of slavery), and charoset (a sweet paste, possibly representing the mortar which the Jewish slaves used to cement bricks). Recalling the freedom of the second half of the night, they eat the matzah (the "bread of freedom" as well as the "bread of affliction") and 'afikoman', and drink the four cups of wine, in a reclining position, and dip vegetables into salt water (the dipping being a sign of royalty and freedom).

=== The Four Cups ===
There is an obligation to drink four cups of wine during the Seder. The Mishnah says (Pesachim 10:1) that even the poor are obliged to drink the four cups. Each cup is imbibed at a specific point in the Seder. The first is for Kiddush (קידוש), the second is for 'Maggid' (מגיד), the third is for Birkat Hamazon (ברכת המזון) and the fourth is for Hallel (הלל).

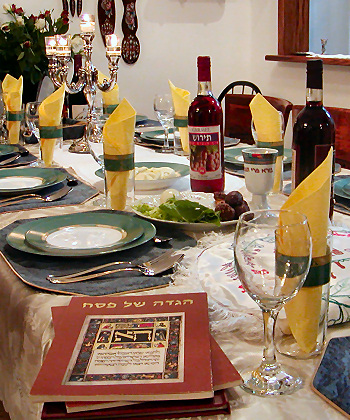
Passover Seder table

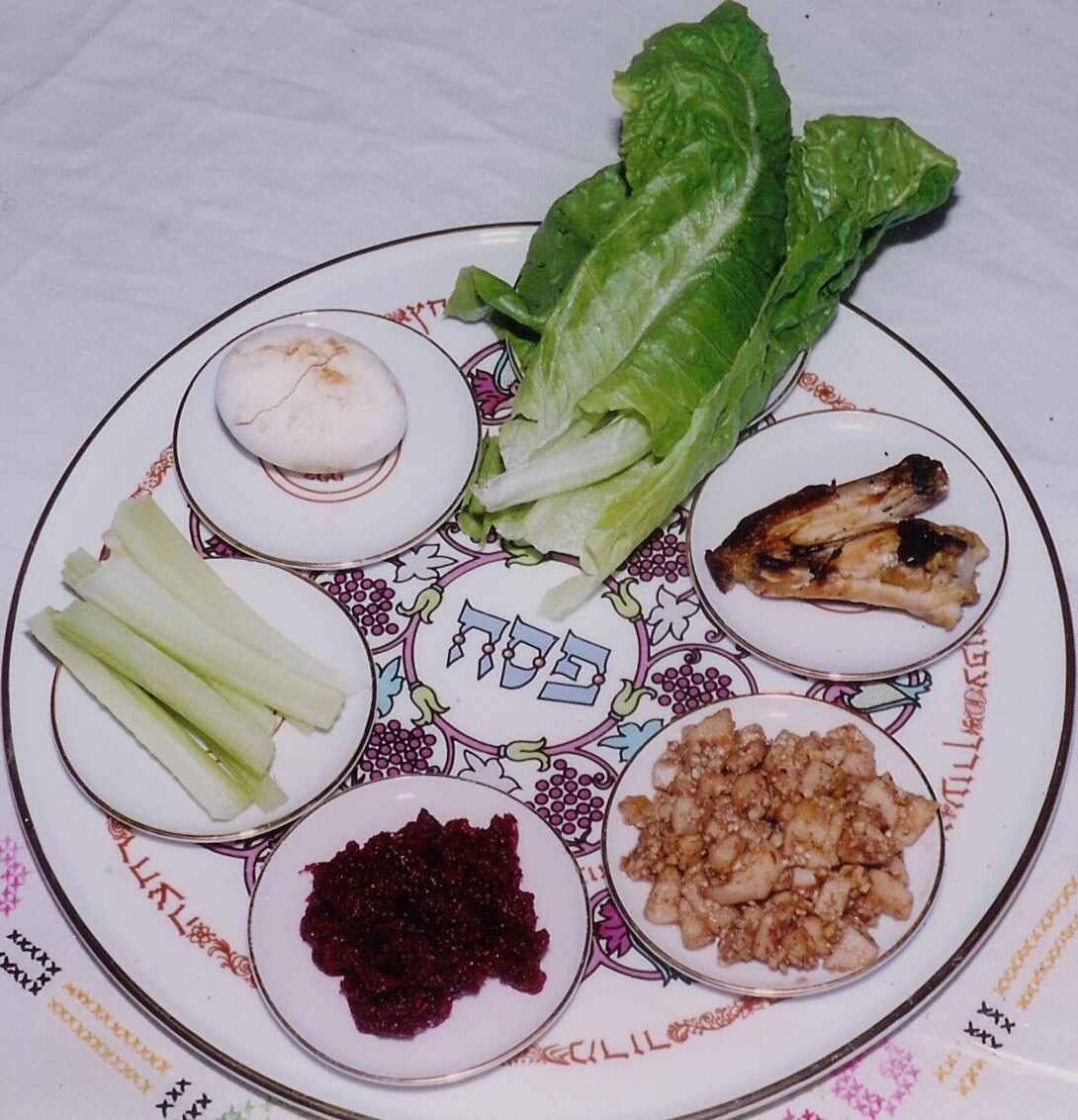
Traditional arrangement of symbolic foods on a Passover Seder plate

The Four Cups represent the four expressions of deliverance promised by God Exodus 6:6–7: "I will bring out," "I will deliver," "I will redeem," and "I will take."

The Vilna Gaon relates the Four Cups to four worlds: this world, the Messianic age, the world at the revival of the dead, and the world to come. The MaHaRaL connects them to the four Matriarchs: Sarah, Rebeccah, Rachel, and Leah. (The three matzot, in turn, are connected to the three Patriarchs: Abraham, Isaac, and Jacob.) Abarbanel relates the cups to the four historical redemptions of the Jewish people: the choosing of Abraham, the Exodus from Egypt, the survival of the Jewish people throughout the exile, and the fourth which will happen at the end of days.

The four cups might also reflect the Roman custom of drinking as many cups as there are letters in the name of the chief guest at a meal, which in the case of the Seder is God himself whose Hebrew name has four letters.

=== Seder plate ===
The special Passover Seder plate (ke'arah) is the special plate containing symbolic foods used during the Passover Seder. Each of the six items arranged on the plate has special significance to the retelling of the story of the Exodus from Egypt. The seventh symbolic item used during the meal – a stack of three matzot – is placed on its own plate on the Seder table.

The six items on the Seder plate are:

- Maror: Bitter herbs, which Gamaliel says symbolize the bitterness and harshness of the slavery which the Jews endured in Ancient Egypt. For maror, many people use freshly grated horseradish or whole horseradish root.
- Chazeret is typically romaine lettuce, whose roots are bitter-tasting. In addition to horseradish and romaine lettuce, other forms of bitter lettuce, such as endive, may be eaten in fulfillment of the mitzvah, as well as green onions, dandelion greens, celery leaves, or curly parsley (but parsley and celery are more commonly used as the karpas or vegetable element). Much depends upon whether one's tradition is Ashkenazic, Sephardic, Mizrahi, Persian, or one of the many other Jewish ethno-cultural traditions.
- Charoset: A sweet, brown, pebbly paste of fruits and nuts, possibly representing the mortar used by the Jewish slaves to build the storehouses of Egypt. The actual recipe depends partly on ethno-cultural tradition and partly on locally available ingredients. Ashkenazi Jews, for example, traditionally make apple-raisin based charoset while Sephardic Jews often make date-based recipes that might feature orange or/and lemon, or even banana. Other Talmudic traditions claim the Charoset "recalls the apple", apparently referencing a tradition that Jewish women snuck out to apple orchards to conceive in Egypt, and that it is not obligatory but serves to nullify the poison of the maror.
- Karpas: A vegetable other than bitter herbs, sometimes parsley or celery or cooked potato, which is dipped into salt water (Ashkenazi custom), vinegar (Sephardi custom), or charoset (Yemenite Jews) at the beginning of the Seder.
- Zeroa: A roasted lamb or goat bone, symbolizing the korban Pesach (Pesach sacrifice), which was a lamb offered in the Temple in Jerusalem and was then roasted and eaten as part of the meal on Seder night.
- Beitzah: A roast egg – usually a hard-boiled egg that has been roasted in a baking pan with a little oil, or with a lamb shank – symbolizing the korban chagigah (festival sacrifice) that was offered in the Temple in Jerusalem and was then eaten as part of the meal on Seder night.

=== Focus on the children ===
Since the retelling of the Exodus to one's child is the object of the Seder experience, much effort is made to arouse the interest and curiosity of the children and keep them awake during the meal. To that end, questions and answers are a central device in the Seder ritual. By encouraging children to ask questions, they will be more open to hearing the answers.

The most famous question which the youngest child asks at the Seder is the "Ma Nishtana" – 'Why is this night different from all other nights?' After the asking of the questions, the main portion of the Seder, Magid, discusses the answers in the form of a historical review. Also, at different points in the Seder, the leader of the Seder will cover the matzot and lift their cup of wine; then put down the cup of wine and uncover the matzot – all to elicit questions from the children.

In some traditions, the questions are asked by the assembled company in chorus rather than by a child, and are put to the leader of the seder, who either answers the question or may direct the attention of the assembled company to someone who is acting out that particular part of the Exodus. Physical re-enactment of the Exodus during the Passover seder is common in many families and communities.

Families follow the Haggadah's lead by asking their own questions at various points in the Haggadah, and offering prizes such as nuts and candies for correct answers. The afikoman, which is hidden away for the "dessert" after the meal, is another device used to encourage children's participation. In most families, the leader of the Seder hides the afikoman and the children must find it, whereupon they receive a prize or reward. In other homes, the children hide the afikoman and a parent must look for it; when the parents give up, the children demand a prize (often money) for revealing its location.

== Order and procedures ==
The order and procedures of the Seder are stated and printed in the text of the Passover Haggadah, a copy of which is in front of all participants. The Seder Simanim (סימני הסדר), or the fifteen steps of the Passover Seder, is a mnemonic poem to guide participants through the ritual meal's specific order. While the individual rituals are rooted in the Mishnah (Pesachim 10), the rhyming 15-word mnemonic is generally attributed to the medieval French scholar Rashi (11th century), as recorded in the Machzor Vitry by his student Rabbi Simcha of Vitry, or to the 13th-century Tosafist Rabbi Shmuel of Falaise.

1. Kaddesh (קדש) Sanctify! – recital of Kiddush blessing and drinking of the first cup of wine
2. Urchatz (ורחץ) and Wash! – the washing of the hands
3. Karpas (כרפס) Vegetable – dipping of the karpas in salt water
4. Yachatz (יחץ) Halving – breaking the middle matzah; the larger piece becomes the afikoman
5. Maggid (מגיד) Telling – retelling the Passover story, including the recital of "the four questions" and drinking of the second cup of wine
6. Rochtzah (רחצה) Washing – second washing of the hands
7. Motzi (מוציא) "Who brings out..." – blessing over the bread
8. Matzah (מצה) "...matzah" – blessing before eating matzah
9. Maror (מרור) Bitter – eating of the maror
10. Korech (כורך) Wraps – eating of a sandwich made of matzo and maror
11. Shulchan Orech (שלחן עורך) Set table – the serving of the holiday meal
12. Tzafun (צפון) Hidden – eating of the afikoman
13. Barech (ברך) Bless! – blessing after the meal and drinking of the third cup of wine
14. Hallel (הלל) Exalt! – recital of the Hallel, traditionally recited on festivals; drinking of the fourth cup of wine
15. Nirtzah (נרצה) Desired – say "Next Year in Jerusalem!"

=== Kadeish (blessings and the first cup of wine) ===
Kadeish (קדש) is the Hebrew imperative for kiddush. It should be recited as soon as the synagogue services are over but not before nightfall. This kiddush is similar to that which is recited on all of the Three Pilgrimage Festivals, but also refers to matzot and the exodus from Egypt. Acting in a way that shows freedom and majesty, many Jews have the custom of filling each other's cups at the Seder table. The kiddush is traditionally said by the father of the house, but all Seder participants may participate by reciting the Kiddush and drinking at least most of the first cup of wine. On Shabbat, it is preceded by a reading from the Book of Genesis recounting God's rest on the seventh day of creation, and includes an extended doxology on the blessings of Shabbat.

=== Urchatz (wash hands) ===
Technically, according to Jewish law, whenever one partakes of fruits or vegetables dipped in liquid while remaining wet, one must wash one's hands if the fruit or vegetable remains wet. However, at other times of the year, one has either already washed their hands before eating bread, or dry the fruit or vegetable, in which case one need not wash their hands before eating the fruit or vegetable.

According to most traditions, no blessing is recited at this point in the Seder, unlike the blessing recited over the washing of the hands before eating bread. However, followers of Rambam or the Gaon of Vilna do recite a blessing.

=== Karpas (appetizer) ===
Each participant dips a vegetable into either salt water (an Ashkenazi custom; said to serve as a reminder of the tears shed by their enslaved ancestors), vinegar (a Sephardi custom) or charoset (an older Sephardi custom, still common among Yemenite Jews). Another custom mentioned in some Ashkenazi sources and probably originating with Meir of Rothenburg, was to dip the karpas in wine.

=== Yachatz (breaking of the middle matzah) ===
Three matzot are stacked on the seder table; at this stage, the middle matzah of the three is broken in half. The larger piece is hidden, to be used later as the afikoman, the "dessert" after the meal. The smaller piece is returned to its place between the other two matzot.

Moroccan Jewish custom is that when the matzah is split, a passage is recited describing how "in this manner God split the Red Sea" in the aftermath of the Exodus.

Before Magid, some Sephardi families have a custom to sing "Bivhilu yatzanu mi-mitzrayim" (translated: 'In haste we left Egypt'). While this is being sung, the head of the household walks around the table with the Seder plate and waves it over each individual's head.

=== Magid (relating the Exodus) ===
The story of Passover, and the change from slavery to freedom is told. At this point in the Seder, Moroccan Jews have a custom of raising the Seder plate over the heads of all those present while chanting "Bivhilu yatzanu mimitzrayim, halahma anya b'nei horin" ('In haste we went out of Egypt [with our] bread of affliction, [now we are] free people').

==== Ha Lachma Anya (invitation to the Seder) ====
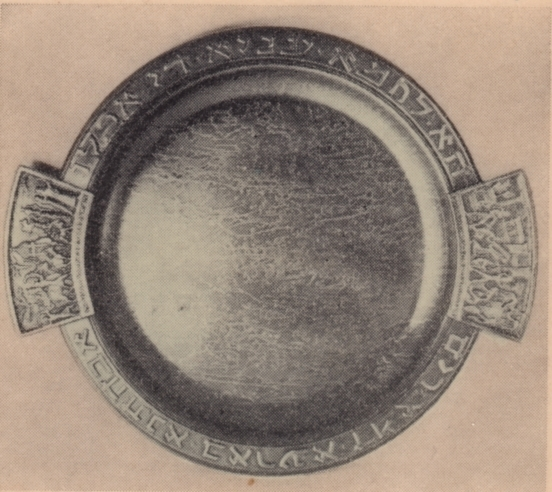
A bronze matzo plate designed by Maurice Ascalon, inscribed with the opening words of Ha Lachma Anya

The matzot are uncovered, and referred to as the "bread of affliction". Participants declare (in Aramaic) an invitation to all who are hungry or needy to join in the Seder. Halakha requires that this invitation be repeated in the native language of the country.

==== Mah Nishtanah (The Four Questions) ====
The Mishna details questions one is obligated to ask on the night of the seder. It is customary for the youngest child present to recite the four questions. Some customs hold that the other participants recite them quietly to themselves as well. In some families, this means that the requirement remains on an adult "child" until a grandchild of the family receives sufficient Jewish education to take on the responsibility. If a person has no children capable of asking, the responsibility falls to their spouse, or another participant. The need to ask is so great that even if a person is alone at the seder they are obligated to ask themselves and to answer their own questions.

0. Ma nishtana ha lyla ha zeh mikkol hallaylot? ('Why is this night different from all other nights?')
1. Shebb'khol hallelot anu okh'lin ḥamets umatsa, vehallayla hazze kullo matsa. ('Why is it that on all other nights during the year we eat either leavened bread or matza, but on this night we eat only matza?')
2. Shebb'khol hallelot anu okh'lin sh'ar y'rakot, vehallayla hazze maror. ('Why is it that on all other nights we eat all kinds of vegetables, but on this night we eat bitter herbs?')
3. Shebb'khol hallelot en anu matbillin afillu pa'am eḥat, vehallayla hazze sh'tei fe'amim. ('Why is it that on all other nights we do not dip [our food] even once, but on this night we dip them twice?')
4. Shebb'khol hallelot anu okh'lin ben yosh'vin uven m'subbin, vehallayla hazze kullanu m'subbin. ('Why is it that on all other nights we dine either sitting upright or reclining, but on this night we all recline?')

The question about reclining substitutes for a question about eating roasted meat, that was present in the mishnah but removed by later authorities due to its inapplicability after the destruction of the temple:

4. Shebb'khol hallelot anu okh'lin basar tsali shaluk umvushal, vehallayla hazze kullo tsali. ('Why is it that on all other nights we eat meat either roasted, marinated, or cooked, but on this night it is entirely roasted?')

Roasted sacrifices were no longer possible after the destruction, and roasted meat was therefore disallowed on seder night, to avoid ambiguity.

The four questions have been translated into over 300 languages.

==== The Four Sons ====
The traditional Haggadah speaks of "four sons" – one who is wise, one who is wicked, one who is simple, and one who does not know to ask. This is based upon the rabbis of the Jerusalem Talmud finding four references in the Torah to responding to your son who asks a question. Each of these sons phrases his question about the seder in a different way. The Haggadah recommends answering each son according to his question, using one of the three verses in the Torah that refer to this exchange.

The wise son asks "What are the statutes, the testimonies, and the laws that God has commanded us to do?" One explanation for why this very detailed-oriented question is categorized as wise, is that the wise son is trying to learn how to carry out the seder, rather than asking for someone else's understanding of its meaning. He is answered fully: "You should reply to him with [all] the laws of pesach: one may not eat any dessert after the paschal sacrifice."

The wicked son, who asks, "What is this service to you?", is characterized by the Haggadah as isolating himself from the Jewish people, standing by objectively and watching their behavior rather than participating. Therefore, he is rebuked by the explanation that "It is because God acted for my sake when I left Egypt." (This implies that the Seder is not for the wicked son because the wicked son would not have deserved to be freed from Egyptian slavery.) Where the four sons are illustrated in the Haggadah, this son has frequently been depicted as carrying weapons or wearing stylish contemporary fashions.

The simple son, who asks, "What is this?" is answered with "With a strong hand the Almighty led us out from Egypt, from the house of bondage."

The one who does not know to ask is told, "It is because of what the Almighty did for me when I left Egypt."

Some modern Haggadahs mention "children" instead of "sons", and some have added a fifth child. The fifth child represents the son who, in contrast to the other four sons, does not even attend a Seder. Just as it is the responsibility of those in the position to teach, to educate the four sons, it is likewise the responsibility of anyone who is able to, to encourage participation in the Seder of those who otherwise would not.

For the former, tradition is to say that for that child one asks "Why?" and, like the simple child, has no answer.

==== "Go and learn" ====
Four verses in Deuteronomy (26:5–8) are then expounded, with an elaborate, traditional commentary based on the Sifre. ("And thou shalt speak and say before the Lord thy God: 'A wandering Aramean was my parent, and they went down into Egypt, and sojourned there, few in number; and became there a nation, great, mighty, and populous. And the Egyptians dealt ill with us, and afflicted us, and laid upon us hard bondage. And we cried unto the Lord, the God of our parents, and the Lord heard our voice, and saw our affliction, and our toil, and our oppression. And the Lord brought us forth out of Egypt with a strong hand and an outstretched arm, and with great terribleness, and with signs, and with wonders.")

The Haggadah explores the meaning of those verses, and elaborates on the story. This telling describes the slavery of the Jewish people and their miraculous salvation by God. This culminates in an enumeration of the Ten Plagues:

1. Dam (blood) – All the water was changed to blood
2. Tzefardeyah (frogs) – An infestation of frogs sprang up in Egypt
3. Kinim (lice) – The Egyptians were afflicted by lice
4. Arov (wild animals) – An infestation of wild animals (some say flies) sprang up in Egypt
5. Dever (pestilence) – A plague killed off the Egyptian livestock
6. Sh'chin (boils) – An epidemic of boils afflicted the Egyptians
7. Barad (hail) – Hail rained from the sky
8. Arbeh (locusts) – Locusts swarmed over Egypt
9. Choshech (darkness) – Egypt was covered in darkness
10. Makkat Bechorot (killing of the first-born) – All the first-born sons of the Egyptians were slain by God

With the recital of the Ten Plagues, there is a late custom, which arose in German-Jewish circles, that each participant removes a drop of wine from their cup using a fingertip at the mention of each of the ten plagues. Although this night is one of salvation, Don Isaac Abravanel explains that one cannot be completely joyous when some of God's creatures had to suffer. A mnemonic acronym for the plagues is also introduced: "D'tzach Adash B'achav" (דצך אדש באחב), while similarly spilling a drop of wine for each word.

At this part in the Seder, songs of praise are sung, including the song Dayenu, which proclaims that had God performed any single one of the many deeds performed for the Jewish people, it would have been enough to obligate us to give thanks. Some sing instead The Women's Dayenu, a feminist variant of Dayenu, by Michele Landsberg.

After Dayenu is a declaration (mandated by Rabban Gamliel) of the reasons of the commandments of the Paschal lamb, Matzah, and Maror, with scriptural sources. Then follows a short prayer, and the recital of the first two psalms of Hallel (which will be concluded after the meal). A long blessing is recited, and the second cup of wine is drunk.

=== Rohtzah (ritual washing of hands) ===
The ritual hand-washing is repeated, this time with all customs including a blessing.

=== Motzi (blessings over the Matzah) ===
Two blessings are recited.

First one recites the standard blessing before eating bread, which includes the words "who brings forth" (motzi in Hebrew).

=== Matzah ===
Then one recites the blessing regarding the commandment to eat Matzah.

An olive-size piece (some say two) is then eaten while reclining to the left.

=== Maror (bitter herbs) ===
The blessing for the eating of the maror (bitter herbs) is recited and then it is to be eaten.

=== Korech (sandwich) ===
The maror (bitter herb) is placed between two small pieces of matzo, similarly to how the contents of a sandwich are placed between two slices of bread, and eaten. This follows the tradition of Hillel, who did the same at his Seder table 2000 years ago (except that in Hillel's day the Paschal sacrifice, matzo, and maror were eaten together.)

=== Shulchan Orech (the meal) ===
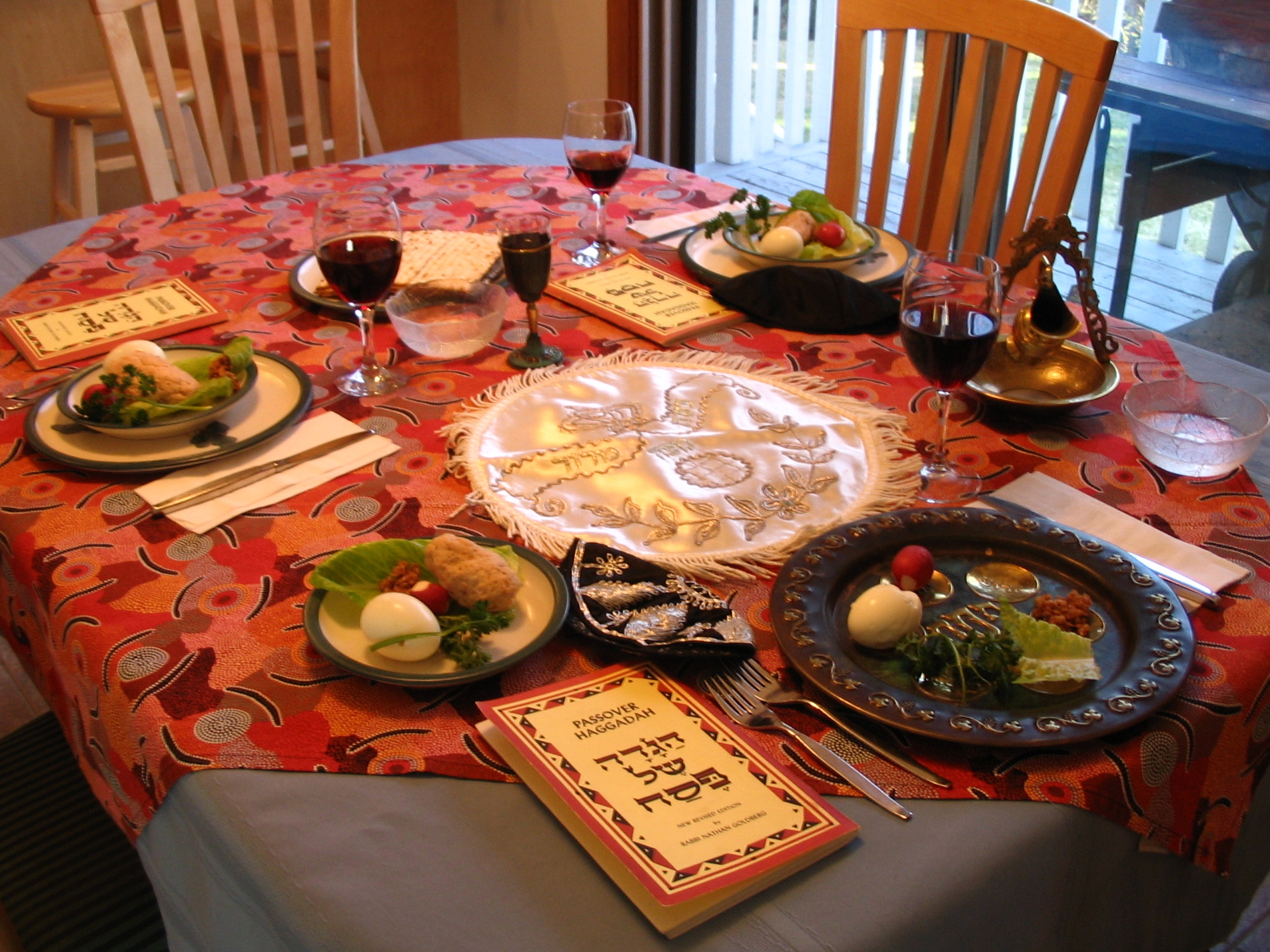
A Seder table setting

The festive meal is eaten. Traditionally it begins with a hard boiled egg dipped in salt water, referencing the charred egg on the Seder plate. In Yiddish, there is a saying: מיר צוגרייטן די טיש און עסן די פיש, which means "We set the table and eat the fish".

=== Tzafun (eating of the afikoman) ===
The afikoman, which was hidden earlier in the Seder, is traditionally the last morsel of food eaten by participants in the Seder.

Each participant receives an olive-sized portion of matzo to be eaten as afikoman. After the consumption of the afikoman, traditionally, no other food may be eaten for the rest of the night. Additionally, no intoxicating beverages may be consumed, with the exception of the remaining two cups of wine.

=== Bareich (Grace after Meals) ===
The recital of Birkat Hamazon.

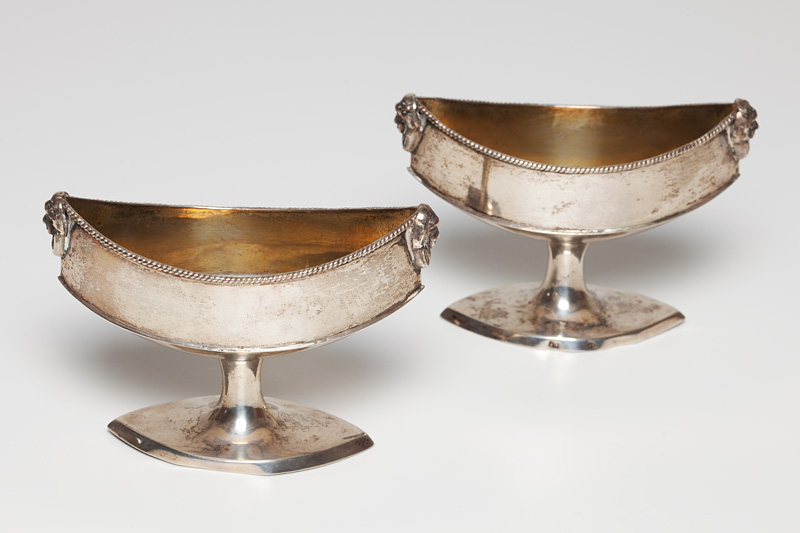
Seder cups, dated between 1790 and 1810. In the Jewish Museum of Switzerland’s collection.

==== Kos Shlishi (the Third Cup of Wine) ====
The drinking of the Third Cup of Wine.

Note: The Third Cup is customarily poured before the Grace after Meals is recited because the Third Cup also serves as a Cup of Blessing associated with the Grace after Meals on special occasions.

==== Kos shel Eliyahu ha-Navi (cup of Elijah the Prophet); Miriam's cup ====
In many traditions, the front door of the house is opened at this point. Psalms 79:6–7 is recited in both Ashkenazi and Sephardi traditions, plus Lamentations 3:66 among Ashkenazim.

Most Ashkenazim have the custom to fill both a fourth and a fifth cup at this point. This relates to a Talmudic discussion that concerns the number of cups that are supposed to be drunk. Given that the four cups are in reference to the four expressions of redemption in Exodus 6:6–7, some rabbis felt that it was important to include a fifth cup for the fifth expression of redemption in Exodus 6:8. All agreed that five cups should be poured but the question as to whether or not the fifth should be drunk, given that the fifth expression of redemption concerned being brought into the Land of Israel, which – by this stage – was no longer possessed of an autonomous Jewish community, remained insoluble. The rabbis determined that the matter should be left until Elijah (in reference to the notion that Elijah's arrival would precipitate the coming of the Moshiach (Jewish Messiah), at which time all halakhic questions will be resolved) and the fifth cup came to be known as the Kos shel Eliyahu ("Cup of Elijah"). Over time, people came to relate this cup to the notion that Elijah will visit each Jewish home on Seder night as a foreshadowing of his future arrival at the end of the days, when he will come to announce the coming of the Moshiach, and that the door is opened for him to enter.

Some seders (including the original Women's Seder, but not limited to women-only seders) now set out a cup for the prophet Miriam as well as the traditional cup for the prophet Elijah, sometimes accompanied by a ritual to honor Miriam. Miriam's cup originated in the 1980s in a Boston Rosh Chodesh group; it was invented by Stephanie Loo, who filled it with mayim hayim (living waters) and used it in a feminist ceremony of guided meditation. Miriam's cup is linked to the midrash of Miriam's well, which "is a rabbinic legend that tells of a miraculous well that accompanied the Israelites during their 40 years in the desert at the Exodus from Egypt".

=== Hallel (songs of praise) ===
The entire order of Hallel which is usually recited in the synagogue on Jewish holidays is also recited at the Seder table, albeit sitting down. The first two psalms, 113 and 114, were recited before the meal. The remaining psalms 115–118, are recited at this point. Psalm 136 (the Great Hallel) is then recited, followed by Nishmat, a portion of the morning service for Shabbat and festivals.

There are a number of opinions concerning the paragraph Yehalelukha which normally follows Hallel, and Yishtabakh, which normally follows Nishmat. Most Ashkenazim recite Yehalelukha immediately following the Hallel proper, i.e. at the end of Psalm 118, except for the concluding words. After Nishmat, they recite Yishtabakh in its entirety. Sephardim recite Yehalelukha alone after Nishmat.

Afterwards the Fourth Cup of Wine is drunk and a brief blessing for the "fruit of the vine" is said.

=== Nirtzah ===
The Seder concludes with a prayer that the night's service be accepted. A hope for the Messiah is expressed: "L'shanah haba'ah b'Yerushalayim! – Next year in Jerusalem!" The passage first appears as part of the liturgy for Passover in the Birds' Head Haggadah published around 1300 and was attested a century later by Rabbi Isaac Tyrnau as an accepted component of the Seder. Jews in Israel, and especially those in Jerusalem, recite instead "L'shanah haba'ah b'Yerushalayim hab'nuyah! – Next year in the rebuilt Jerusalem!" Jerusalem is the holiest city in the Bible; it has become symbolic of the idea of spiritual perfection. The tradition of saying "Next year in Jerusalem" is similar to the tradition of opening the door for Elijah: it recognizes that “this year” we live in an imperfect world outside of “Jerusalem,” but we patiently await a time, hopefully “next year,” in which we live in spiritual perfection.

Although the 15 orders of the Seder have been complete, the Haggadah concludes with additional songs which further recount the miracles that occurred on this night in Ancient Egypt as well as throughout history. Some songs express a prayer that the Beit Hamikdash will soon be rebuilt. The last song to be sung is Chad Gadya ("One Kid Goat"). This seemingly childish song about different animals and people who attempted to punish others for their crimes and were in turn punished themselves, was interpreted by the Vilna Gaon as an allegory to the retribution God will levy over the enemies of the Jewish people at the end of days.

Following the Seder, those who are still awake may recite the Song of Songs, engage in Torah learning, or continue talking about the events of the Exodus until sleep overtakes them.

== Cooking ==
There are many cookbooks published with recipes for Passover:

- A collection of family cookbook recipes of Passover was published by Lerner Publishing Group and its Kar-Ben Publishing division. Another compilation of family recipes with a Passover chapter notes the habit of some cooks complicating standard format recipes, shiterein, a Yiddish word meaning improvisational cooking, "denoting one who cooks from experience and touch without recipes or measuring".
- University of Minnesota Libraries holds a special collection of Jewish cookbook recipes, including Passover and other holiday compilations "mostly from [Minnesota] women's groups".
- Tastes of Freedom: A Passover Cookbook is a book compiling A Taste of Pesach, "a recipe pamphlet series that transformed Passover cooking for tens of thousands of cooks" published by Yeshiva Me'on Hatorah.
- Wonder Pot recipes for Passover can be found in The New Kosher for Passover Cookbook.
- American journalist and cookbook author Joan Nathan has published a "combination memoir and cookbook", My Life in Recipes, including family Passover recipes.
- American cookbook author Susie Fishbein wrote the cookbook Passover by Design.
- The New York Times published a Passover cookbook.
- Kosher.com writer Naomi Nachman has written a Passover cookbook, Perfect for Pesach.
- At least one Passover cookbook has been written by a notable person in a language other than English: Shaily Lipa's שי-לי מבשלת - חג האביב, Shaily mevashelet – Chag ha-'Aviv ("Shaily cooks – Passover * Holiday"), 2017.

== Non-traditional Seders ==
=== Feminist Seders ===
In 1976, the first of a series of women-only Passover seders was held in Esther M. Broner's New York City apartment and led by her, with 13 women attending, including Gloria Steinem, Letty Cottin Pogrebin, and Phyllis Chesler. Esther Broner and Naomi Nimrod created a women's haggadah for use at this seder. In the spring of 1976 Esther Broner published this "Women's Haggadah" in Ms magazine, later publishing it as a book in 1994; this haggadah is meant to include women where only men had been mentioned in traditional haggadahs, and it features the Wise Women, the Four Daughters, the Women's Questions, the Women's Plagues, and a women-centric "Dayenu". The original Women's Seder has been held with the Women's Haggadah every year since 1976, and women-only seders are now held by some congregations as well. Some seders (including the original Women's Seder, but not limited to women-only seders) now set out a cup for the prophet Miriam as well as the traditional cup for the prophet Elijah, accompanied by a ritual to honor Miriam. Miriam's cup originated in the 1980s in a Boston Rosh Chodesh group; it was invented by Stephanie Loo, who filled it with mayim hayim (living waters) and used it in a feminist ceremony of guided meditation. Miriam's cup is linked to the midrash of Miriam's well, which "is a rabbinic legend that tells of a miraculous well that accompanied the Israelites during their 40 years in the desert at the Exodus from Egypt". Furthermore, some Jews include an orange on the seder plate. The orange represents the fruitfulness for all Jews when all marginalized peoples are included, particularly women and gay people. An incorrect but common rumor says that this tradition began when a man told Susannah Heschel that a woman belongs on the bimah as an orange on the seder plate; however, it actually began when in the early 1980s, while speaking at Oberlin College Hillel, Susannah Heschel was introduced to an early feminist Haggadah that suggested adding a crust of bread on the seder plate, as a sign of solidarity with Jewish lesbians (as some would say there's as much room for a lesbian in Judaism as there is for a crust of bread on the seder plate). Heschel felt that to put bread—forbidden at Passover—on the seder plate would be to accept that Jewish lesbians and gay men violate Judaism like chametz violates Passover, so at her next seder, she chose an orange as a symbol of inclusion of gays, lesbians, and others who are marginalized within the Jewish community. In addition, the orange had seeds that had to be spat out – a gesture of spitting out and repudiating what they saw as the homophobia of traditional Judaism.

Many Haggadah now use gender-neutral English translations.

=== Public Seders ===
The group of people who hold a Passover Seder together is referred to in the Talmud (tractate Pesachim) as a chavurah (group). In the Far East, for example, Chabad-Lubavitch emissaries regularly conduct Seders for hundreds of visiting students, businesspeople and Jewish travelers. The Chabad Seder in Kathmandu regularly attracts more than 1,200 participants. In 2006, the Federation of Jewish Communities of the CIS and Baltic Countries organized over 500 public Seders throughout the former Soviet Union, led by local rabbis and Chabad rabbinical students, attended by more than 150,000 people.

In Israel, where permanent residents observe only one Seder, overseas students learning in yeshivas and women's seminaries are often invited in groups up to 100 for "second-day Seders" hosted by outreach organizations and private individuals.

=== Christian Seders ===
Some Christians, especially but not only Evangelical Protestants, have within the past ten to twenty years taken great interest in performing Seders according to the ancient rubric. Many churches host Seders, usually adding a Messianic Christian Passover message, and many times inviting Messianic Jews to lead and teach on it. The Christian Gospels place the Last Supper at Passover, so that some Christians have interpreted it as a Seder; in consequence some Christian Seders are on Maundy Thursday as part of commemorating the Last Supper. Many Christians cite the meal as a way to connect with the heritage of their own religion and to see how the practices of the ancient world are still relevant to Christianity today. However, the current form of the Passover Seder dates from the Rabbinic period, significantly after Christianity and Judaism had already gone their separate ways. Some Jews and Christians consider Christian Seders an inappropriate cultural appropriation of Jewish ritual for non-Jewish purposes.

=== Interfaith Seders ===
A number of churches hold interfaith Seders where Jews and non-Jews alike are invited to share in the story and discuss common themes of peace, freedom, and religious tolerance. During the American civil rights movement of the 1960s, interfaith Seders energized and inspired leaders from various communities who came together to march for equal protection for all. The first of these, the Freedom Seder, was written by Arthur Waskow, published in Ramparts magazine and in a small booklet by the Micah Press and in a later edition (1970) by Holt-Rinehart-Winston, and was actually performed on April 4, 1969, the first anniversary of the death of Martin Luther King, Jr. and the third night of Passover, at Lincoln Memorial Temple in Washington, DC. It celebrated the liberation struggle of Black America alongside that of ancient Israel from Pharaoh, and was the first Haggadah to go beyond the original Biblical story. It sparked a large number of Haggadahs celebrating various other forms of liberation – feminism, vegetarianism, the liberation movements in Latin America in the 1970s, ecological healing, etc.. Today, many Unitarian Universalist congregations hold annual interfaith community Seders. A number of interfaith Passover Seder Haggadahs have been written especially for this purpose.

=== White House Passover Seder ===
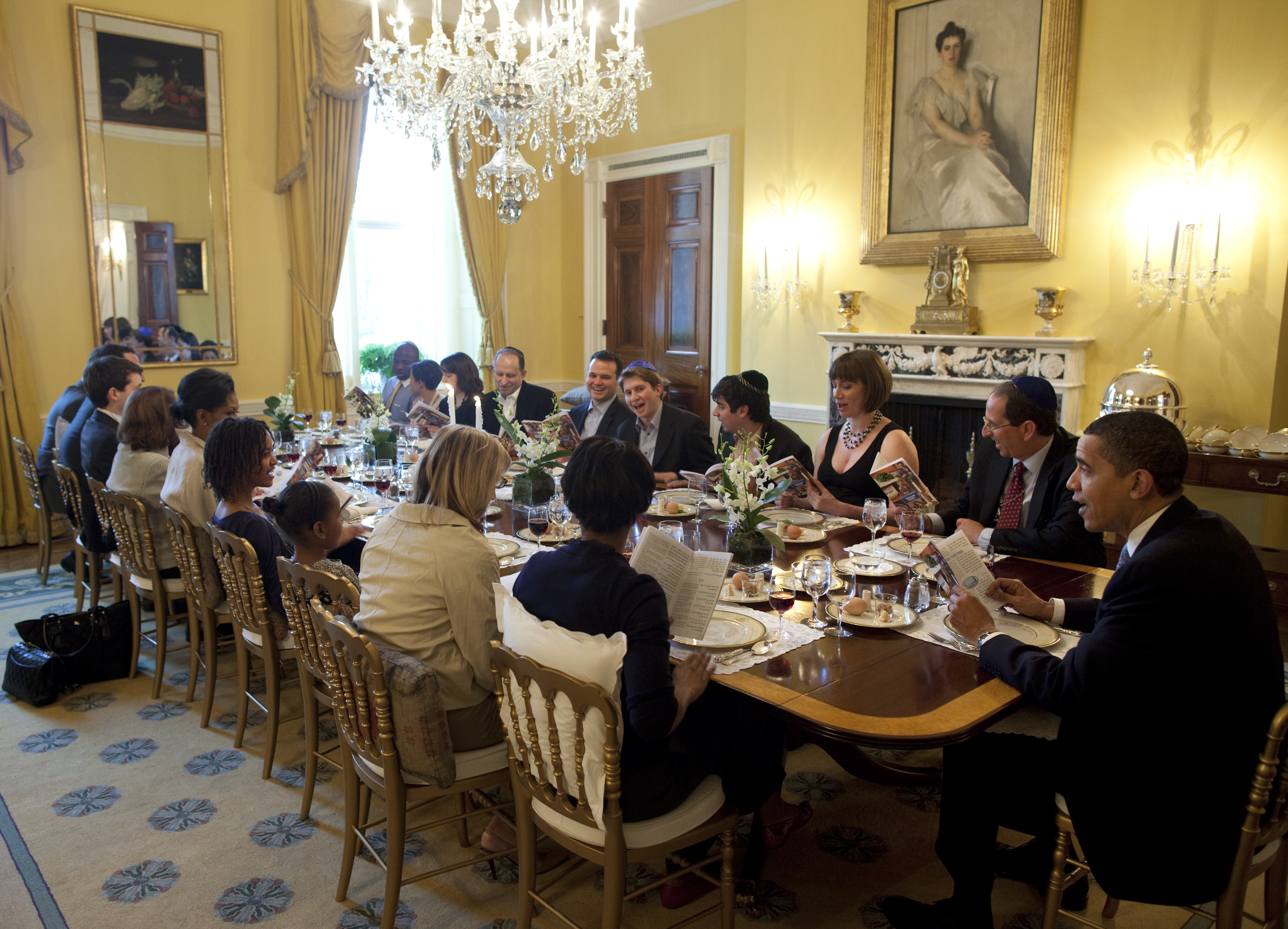
The Obamas host the first White House Passover Seder in 2009 (White House photo).

In 2009 US President Barack Obama began conducting an annual Passover seder in the Old Family Dining Room of the White House, marking the first time that a sitting president hosted a Seder in the White House. The private dinner for about 20 guests, both Jewish and non-Jewish – including the President and his family, members of the president's and first lady's staffs, and friends and their families – features the reading of the Haggadah, traditional rituals such as the hiding of the afikoman and the cup of Elijah, and the reading of the Emancipation Proclamation.

=== Virtual Seders ===
When people wish to participate in a shared Seder but are unable to be physically together, technology such as videoconferencing software can be used to facilitate a "virtual" Seder. In 2020, the COVID-19 pandemic resulted in a surge of virtual Seders, as many Jews sought to practice social distancing during the holiday, or lived in jurisdictions where they were legally required to do so. The website OneTable saw a fourfold increase in the number of virtual seders it hosted from 2019 to 2020, and Zoom videoconferencing software was widely used to host virtual Seders. Virtual seders were endorsed by Progressive rabbis but eschewed by Orthodox rabbis. The Rabbinical Assembly of Conservative Judaism issued guidance (though not an official Conservative responsum) specific to 2020 on using videoconferencing to facilitate Seders while avoiding or minimizing violations of Yom Tov restrictions on the use of electrical devices on holidays.

=== Seder in space ===
In 2022, the Israeli astronaut Eytan Stibbe participated in the first privately sponsored trip to the International Space Station as part of the Rakia mission to conduct science and technology experiments for a number of universities and startups in Israel. As part of the “Rakia” mission, Stibbe held the first Seder in space on the first night of the holiday. This included reciting kiddush, drinking grape juice, eating matzah, and relating to his fellow astronauts about the values that the Seder tradition and the reading of the Haggadah can teach, noting that the story of the exodus from Egypt of the people of Israel "from slavery into freedom" shows that "no dream is beyond reach".

== In popular culture ==
In the second season of the television series Peaky Blinders, there is a scene in which Arthur Shelby is invited to celebrate the Passover Seder at the home of Alfie Solomons as part of a truce negotiation. The depiction of the Seder contains several inaccuracies, such as the presence of leavened bread (chametz), strictly forbidden during Passover, on the table. Additionally, Solomons is shown slaughtering a goat and claiming this is a Jewish tradition. In reality, in antiquity Jewish practice involved the ritual sacrifice of a lamb rather than a goat, and only at the Temple in Jerusalem, not private homes .

The film Uncut Gems by Josh and Benny Safdie, starring Adam Sandler, features a scene depicting a typical American Passover Seder.

== See also ==
- Jewish holidays
- Haggadah
- Ashura
- Passover songs
