= Beitza =

Tractate of the Talmud

Tractate of the Talmud
- Seder: Moed
- Number of mishnahs: 42
- Chapters: 5
- Babylonian Talmud pages: 40
- Jerusalem Talmud pages: 22
- Tosefta chapters: 4

Beitza (Hebrew: ביצה) or Bei'a (Aramaic: ביעה) (literally "egg", named after the first word) is a tractate in Seder Mo'ed, dealing with the laws of Yom Tov (holidays). As such, in medieval commentaries on the Talmud, the text is sometimes referred to as "tractate Yom Tov."

It was originally composed in Talmudic Babylon (c.450–c.550 CE). Seder Mo'ed is the second seder (order) in the Mishna, and Beitza is the seventh, eighth, or a later tractate within Mo'ed in the Talmud Yerushalmi (Jerusalem) and typically fourth in the Talmud Bavli (Babylon).

It begins with a discussion of whether it is permitted to eat an egg laid around the time of a festival: "With regard to an egg that was laid on a Festival, Beit Shammai say: It may be eaten, and Beit Hillel say: It may not be eaten."

== Structure ==
The tractate consists of five chapters with a total of 42 mishnayot. Its Babylonian Talmud version is of 40 pages and its Jerusalem Talmud version is of 22 pages.

An overview of the content of chapters is as follows:

- Chapter 1 (Hebrew: בֵּיצָה, romanized: Beitzah, lit. 'Egg') has ten mishnayot. The main theme of this chapter is the law of muktzeh, which is "a thing laid aside" and that cannot be used at the present time. There is a difference of opinion between the schools of Shammai and Hillel as to the force of the law of muktzeh, specifically the application of the carrying prohibition to holy days.
- Chapter 2 (Hebrew: יוֹם טוֹב, romanized: Yom Tov, lit. 'Holiday') has ten mishnayot. This chapter introduces the concept of eruv tavshilin (preparing food on Shabbat for a festival the following day) and begins to delve into what is or is not permitted at festivals, including immersing objects and bringing offerings.
- Chapter 3 (Hebrew: אֵין צָדִין, romanized: Ein Tzadin) has eight mishnayot. Continuing from the previous chapter, the third chapter discusses the permissibility of trapping, buying, and/or selling animals during a festival, along with the practice of checking firstborns for blemishes.
- Chapter 4 (Hebrew: הַמֵּבִיא, romanized: Hamevi) has seven mishnayot. The fourth chapter covers some of the labor allowed on festivals and discusses the reasoning for the permitted labor.
- Chapter 5 (Hebrew: מַשִּׁילִין, romanized: Mashelin) has seven mishnayot. It reiterates some of the discussion on muktzeh, along with discussing laws regarding physical boundaries and travel, as well as leftovers from festivals.
