= Four sons =

Four sons can refer to:

== Religion and mythology ==
- The Four Sons, a Jewish parable
- Four sons of Horus
- The Four Sons of Aymon

== Media ==
- Four Sons, a 1928 film
- Four Sons (1940 film)

== See also ==
- Four Daughters
