= Irvin Ungar =

American former pulpit rabbi and antiquarian bookseller

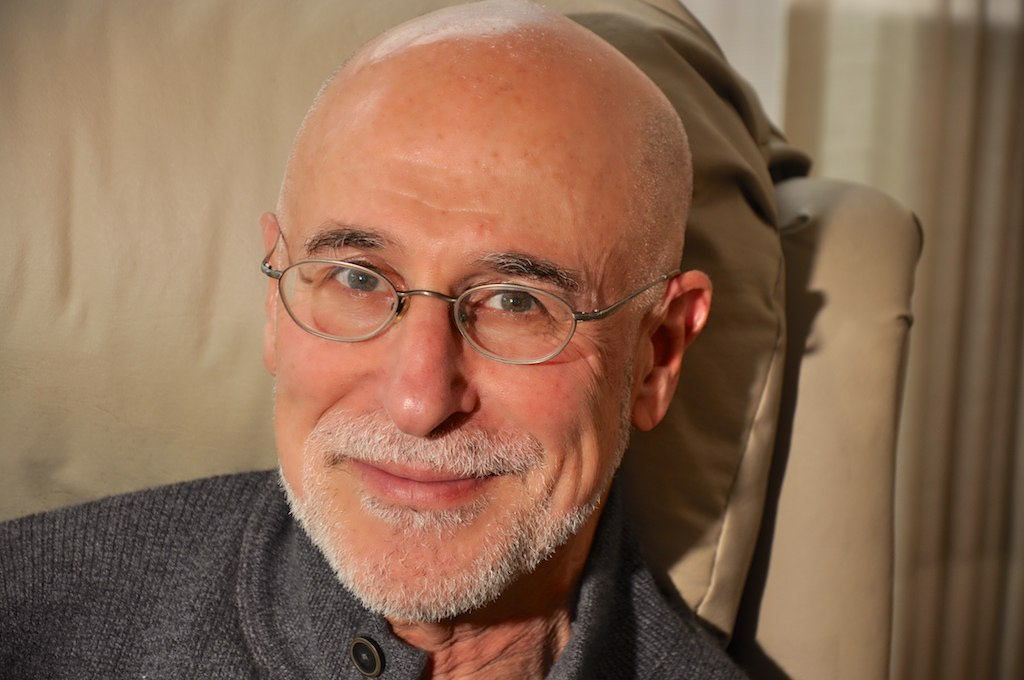
- Born: Irvin D. Ungar; December 10, 1948 (age 77)
- Occupations: Pulpit rabbi (1974 – 1987); CEO of Historicana (1987 – present); Curator of The Arthur Szyk Society (2001 – 2017)
- Notable work: Justice Illuminated: The Art of Arthur Szyk (1998), The Szyk Haggadah and Freedom Illuminated: Understanding the Szyk Haggadah (2008), Arthur Szyk: Soldier in Art (2017), Reviving the Artist Who Fought Hitler: My Life with Arthur Szyk (2026)
- Awards: 2008 Hemlock Award of Excellence, 2012 PubWest Silver Award, 2017 National Jewish Book Award
- Website: szyk.com

Irvin Ungar (born 1948) is an American former pulpit rabbi and antiquarian bookseller, considered the foremost expert on the artist Arthur Szyk. Ungar is credited as “the man behind the Szyk renaissance” who pulled Szyk “out of obscurity” through scholarship, exhibitions, and publications spanning nearly three decades.

== Early life and education ==
Ungar was born in 1948 in Trenton, New Jersey and graduated from Trenton Central High School in 1966. After receiving his B.A. from Washington & Jefferson College in 1970, Ungar then attended rabbinical school, obtaining both his Rabbinic Ordination from the Academy for Jewish Religion and an M.A. in Education from New York University in 1974. While serving as the rabbi at Temple Sinai in Forest Hills, New York (1974 – 1980), Ungar earned his Pastoral Counseling Degree from the Postgraduate Center for Mental Health and his Master of Sacred Theology (S.T.M.) from New York Theological Seminary. Ungar moved to Burlingame, California in 1980 to serve as a rabbi for Peninsula Temple Sholom. During his seven years as a rabbi in Burlingame, Ungar also wrote opinion pieces on social and religious issues for the San Mateo County Times.

== Historicana ==
In 1987, Ungar founded Historicana (known as Holy Land Treasures from 1987 to 1991), becoming an antiquarian book dealer specializing in historic Judaica. In 1991, Historicana became a member of the Antiquarian Booksellers' Association of America. Notable items that Ungar owned and sold over the years include Anne Frank’s “Forget Me Not” autograph inscription; the original handwritten draft in Hebrew of Martin Buber’s 1939 letter to Mahatma Gandhi regarding a two-state solution in Palestine; a rare Theodor Herzl autograph letter, dated November 1900, stating a plan to “bring the cause of Zionism before the English Parliament”; and a letter signed by both King Ferdinand and Queen Isabella, dated 1492, on the confiscation of Jewish property and the expulsion of Jews from Spain. In addition, Historicana produced a series of American Judaica catalogues, as well as one-off catalogues for specialty collections. These included a Zion anniversary catalogue, The Birth of a Nation, commemorating the 50th anniversary of the State of Israel; and the Collector’s Haggadah Catalogue: 1695 – Present, which gave prospective buyers information and prices on almost 1500 Haggadot that Ungar owned at one time.

Ungar's increasing interest in Arthur Szyk changed the direction and scope of Historicana in key ways. In 1999, Historicana became a small publishing imprint to reprint the exhibition catalogue from “Justice Illuminated: The Art of Arthur Szyk,” a Spertus Museum exhibition that Ungar had curated, which was the first major Szyk museum exhibition in decades. From there, Historicana served as publisher or co-publisher for several books about Szyk. In addition to operating Historicana, Ungar amassed the largest single collection of artwork by Szyk to date: The Arthur Szyk Collection was purchased in 2017 by the University of California, Berkeley through a monetary gift from philanthropist Tad Taube.

== Arthur Szyk ==
Ungar first encountered Arthur Szyk's art in 1975, when he purchased a copy of The Haggadah illustrated by Szyk from Bloch Publishing Company in New York. At the time, Szyk was relatively unknown, having fallen into obscurity after his death at age 57 in 1951.

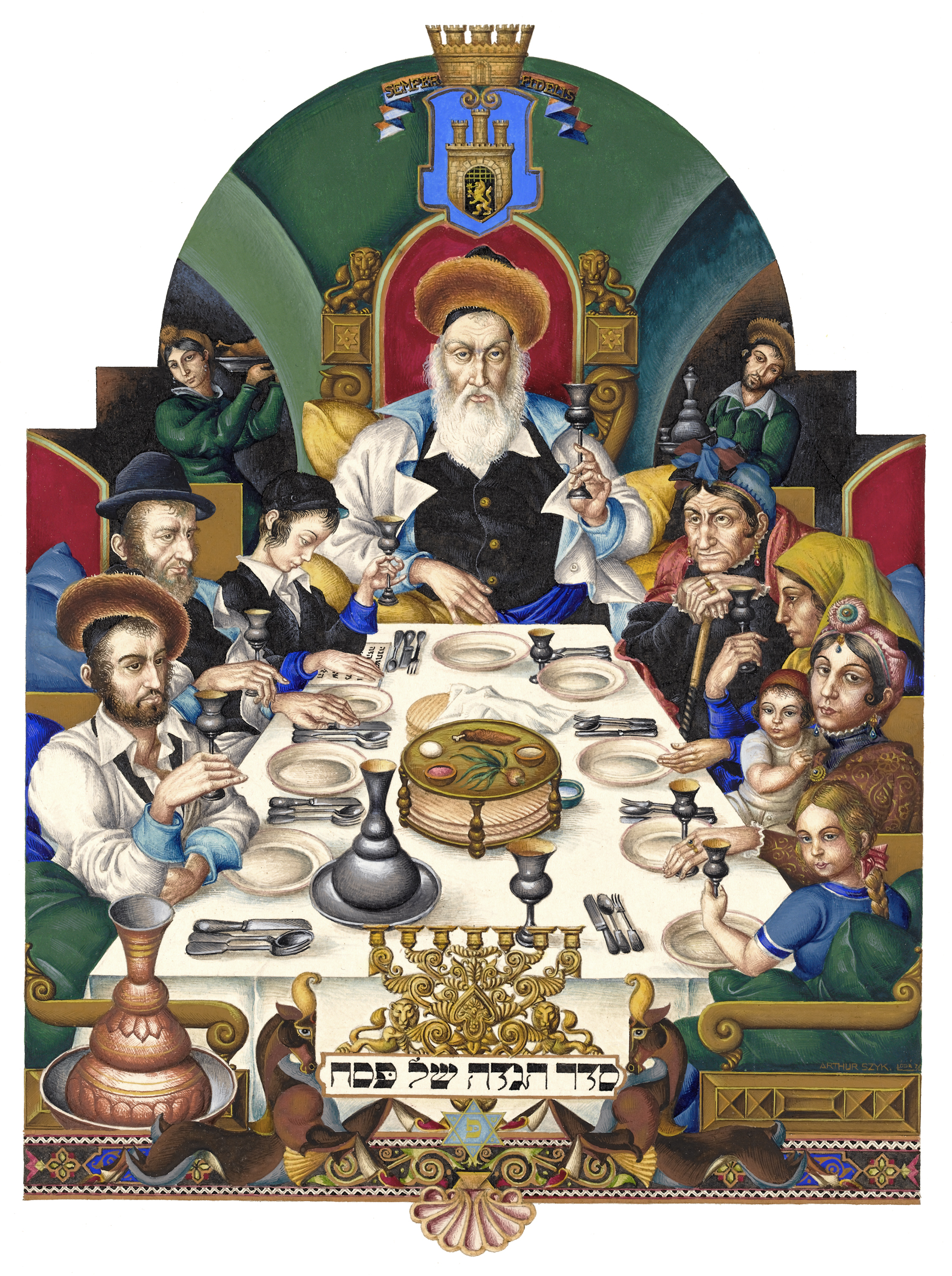
Arthur Szyk, The Family at the Seder from The Haggadah. Łódź, 1935.

Ungar's interest in Arthur Szyk began in the late 1980s, following his purchase of Szyk's Holiday Series prints at an antique shop in Pittsburgh, Pennsylvania. Shortly afterward, Ungar met another antiquarian, Hallam Webber, at a Washington, D.C. book fair. Webber later introduced Ungar to George Gooche, a fellow Szyk collector and founder of The Arthur Szyk Society. Prior to meeting Ungar, Gooche had been in contact with Arthur Szyk’s daughter, Alexandra Szyk Bracie, regarding his goal to preserve Szyk’s memory. Bracie ultimately sold Gooche Arthur Szyk’s personal archives, which included his wife Julia Szyk’s memoirs. Gooche sold the archives to Ungar in 1997.

=== The Arthur Szyk Society ===
George Gooche founded The Arthur Szyk Society in 1991, establishing the nonprofit in Orange County, California, “to disseminate the artist's work and ideals.” In 1997, Ungar assumed responsibility for the Society and moved its headquarters to Burlingame, establishing a new Board of Trustees. In his new role as President of the Society, and later as Society Curator, Ungar increased Szyk’s visibility over a 20-year period through lectures, newsletters, art history papers, and exhibitions, including the traveling exhibition “Justice Illuminated: The Art of Arthur Szyk.”

=== Lectures and addresses ===
Ungar's first public lecture on Arthur Szyk took place at Hebrew University of Jerusalem in 1994, on the hundredth anniversary of the artist’s birth. On three separate occasions, Ungar has been invited to speak on Szyk at the Library of Congress. Ungar also delivered the keynote address at the opening of “Arthur Szyk — Drawing Against National Socialism and Terror” at the Deutsches Historisches Museum in Berlin, and for the opening of the “Justice Illuminated” traveling exhibition at the Jewish Historical Institute in Warsaw, Poland, as part of the Arthur Szyk Society’s Renaissance Tour. Additionally, Ungar has been invited to speak at numerous universities and institutions in the United States and abroad.

=== Publications and media ===
Ungar authored his first essay on Szyk in 1999 in Biblio magazine, with co-author and Szyk biographer Joseph P. Ansell. His other notable essays include an examination of Nostra aetate and De profundis for Moment magazine; Szyk as an “artist for freedom” for Washington’s Rebuke to Bigotry; Szyk’s legacy as a “fighter for justice” for Dziedzictwo Polsko-Zydowskiego Artysty (The Legacy of the Polish-Jewish Artist); a history of The Szyk Haggadah for Freedom Illuminated; Szyk’s Holocaust art for The Holocaust and Nostra Aetate: Toward a Greater Understanding; and a look at Szyk’s role as Franklin Delano Roosevelt’s “soldier in art” for the Norman Rockwell Museum’s traveling exhibition, “Enduring Ideals: Rockwell, Roosevelt & the Four Freedoms.” Ungar was interviewed by Rabbi Mark S. Golub in a one-hour program for the Jewish Broadcasting Service, and was profiled by Steven Heller for the American Institute of Graphic Arts and The Atlantic. Ungar’s memoir, Reviving the Artist Who Fought Hitler: My Life with Arthur Szyk, was published by University of Texas Press in June 2026.

Through the Historicana imprint, Ungar published, edited, and/or produced several books about Arthur Szyk, including Justice Illuminated: The Art of Arthur Szyk (co-publisher and author); The Szyk Haggadah and its companion volume Freedom Illuminated: Understanding The Szyk Haggadah (publisher, co-editor with Byron Sherwin, contributor); Heroes of Ancient Israel: The Playing Card Art of Arthur Szyk (publisher); Arthur Szyk: Soldier in Art (co-publisher, editor, and contributor), which won a 2017 National Jewish Book Award in the category of Visual Arts, and Arthur Szyk Preserved (co-editor with Samantha Lyons). In addition to books, Historicana produced documentary films about Arthur Szyk. In collaboration with filmmaker Jim Ruxin, these films include “Arthur Szyk: Soldier in Art,” “In Every Generation: Remaking the Szyk Haggadah,” and “Soldier in Art: Arthur Szyk—America’s Weapon Against Nazi Germany.”

=== Exhibitions ===
Several museum exhibitions played a significant role in Ungar's goal to bring Szyk back into the mainstream. As guest curator or consultant, Ungar facilitated exhibitions of Szyk's art at Chicago's Spertus Museum (1998 – 1999); the Library of Congress (1999 – 2000); the United States Holocaust Memorial Museum in Washington, D.C. (2002); the Deutsches Historisches Museum in Berlin (2008 – 2009); Palace of the Legion of Honor in San Francisco (2010 – 2011); the Contemporary Jewish Museum in San Francisco (2014); and the New-York Historical Society in New York City (2017 – 2018). In a New York Times review titled “Arthur Szyk: Spotlight Returns to a Forgotten ‘Soldier in Art,’” Ungar is credited as an “obsessive" collector who provided the majority of the original art shown in the Museum of Jewish Heritage’s 2025 – 2026 exhibition “Art of Freedom: The Life & Work of Arthur Szyk.”

=== Byron Sherwin and The Szyk Haggadah ===
Rabbi Byron Sherwin, a renowned Jewish theologian, scholar, and author, collaborated closely with Ungar on several key projects. As Spertus Institute Distinguished Service Professor and Director of Doctoral Programs, Sherwin worked with Ungar on the 1998 Spertus Museum exhibition, “Justice Illuminated: The Art of Arthur Szyk,” and wrote the introduction for the accompanying book of the same title. For The Arthur Szyk Society’s Seymour Fromer Traveling Exhibition Program, also entitled “Justice Illuminated: The Art of Arthur Szyk,” Sherwin wrote the panel text for the traveling photo-mural panels and the accompanying study guide.

Sherwin's most significant collaboration with Ungar was the creation of a new edition of Szyk's Haggadah, originally published in 1940. Published in 2008 as a limited edition, and republished in collaboration with Abrams Books in 2011 as a trade edition, Historicana's The Szyk Haggadah was reproduced entirely from Szyk’s original artwork, the first Szyk Haggadah reproduction since 1940 to do so. For The Szyk Haggadah, Sherwin provided a new English translation from the original Hebrew text and wrote the commentary. Sherwin also served as co-editor for The Szyk Haggadah's companion volume, Freedom Illuminated: Understanding the Szyk Haggadah. Several cultural institutions—including the Vatican, the Metropolitan Museum of Art, the British Library, the Library of Congress, and Princeton University—hold a copy of The Szyk Haggadah and Freedom Illuminated in their special collections.

=== Sale of the collection and Arthur Szyk: Soldier in Art ===
In 2017, Tad Taube of Taube Philanthropies provided the funding to UC Berkeley to purchase The Arthur Szyk Collection from Ungar for the Magnes Collection of Jewish Art and Life. The $10.1 million gift was "the largest single monetary gift to acquire art in the long history of UC Berkeley." The collection consisted of 450 original paintings, illustrations, and sketches spanning Szyk's career, as well as thousands of items from Szyk's personal archives.

A few months after the sale of the collection, Ungar co-published, with GILES of London, the book Arthur Szyk: Soldier in Art to coincide with the New-York Historical Society exhibition of the same name. Szyk and Ungar received considerable media coverage in 2017 and early 2018, thanks in part to press surrounding the sale of the collection, the New York City exhibition, and the Soldier in Art book—which won a National Jewish Book Award from the Jewish Book Council. The Jewish Review of Books notes in a Winter 2018 article that Szyk's “reputation is clearly on the rise again.”
