= Szyk Haggadah =

Passover Haggadah by artist Arthur Szyk

The Szyk Haggadah is a Passover Haggadah that was illustrated by the Polish-Jewish artist Arthur Szyk in Poland between 1934 and 1936. Szyk's visual commentary on the ancient story of Passover uses the vocabulary and format of an illuminated manuscript; each of his 48 full-page watercolor and gouache illuminations contains the traditional text of the Haggadah (in Hebrew calligraphy), which is clarified and interpreted by the images and symbols on the same page.

Szyk first looked for a publisher for his Haggadah in mainland Europe in the mid-1930s but found that his contemporary telling of the Haggadah was met with skepticism. Publishers in Poland, for example, were reluctant to publicize a book that drew a direct parallel between the contemporary policies of Nazi Germany and the genocidal tactics of the pharaoh of the biblical Book of Exodus. (Szyk did take the partial step of painting out the more obvious political references, such as the swastikas on the armbands of the ancient Egyptians who oversaw the Hebrew slaves. Other details, such as the Hitler moustache on the Wicked Son of "The Four Sons", remained.) Ultimately, the publishing house Beaconsfield Press was founded in London in 1937 for the express purpose of publishing The Szyk Haggadah. Szyk moved from Łódź, Poland, to London to supervise every aspect of the book's production. Upon official release of the 1940 vellum edition, which was limited to 250 numbered copies and sold for US$500, The Szyk Haggadah was cited by The Times of London as "worthy to be placed among the most beautiful of books that the hand of man has produced". The Haggadah was dedicated to King George VI of the United Kingdom, who received one of the first copies.

The Szyk Haggadah has been reproduced in popular trade editions in Jerusalem and elsewhere since 1956. A new luxury limited edition, produced by digital printing and with an updated translation and commentary by Byron Sherwin, was edited by Irvin Ungar and published in 2008 by Historicana in Burlingame, California. The documentary film "In Every Generation: Understanding The Szyk Haggadah", directed by James Ruxin, documents the history of The Szyk Haggadah and its contemporary remaking. In 2011, Ungar collaborated with Abrams Books to publish trade copies of The Szyk Haggadah (Historicana, 2008) in hardcover and paperback. In 2014, the Contemporary Jewish Museum in San Francisco displayed all 48 of Arthur Szyk's original Haggadah paintings (together for the first time in sixty years) in an exhibition entitled "Arthur Szyk and the Art of the Haggadah."
