= Arthur Szyk Society =

Nonprofit organization founded to preserve the legacy of the artist Arthur Szyk

The Arthur Szyk Society
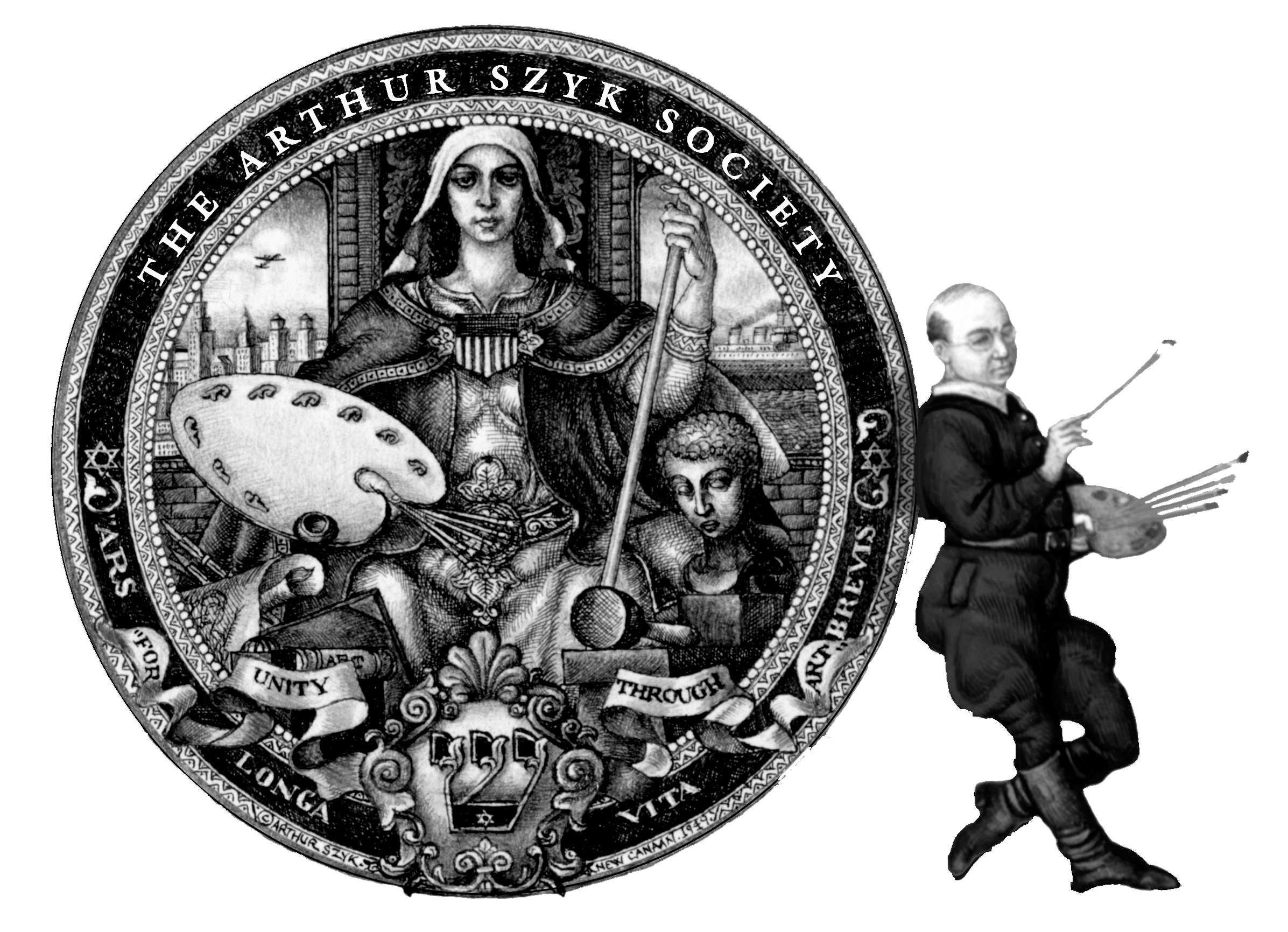
- Formation: 1991
- Dissolved: 2017
- Type: Nonprofit organization
- Purpose: Arts education
- Headquarters: Burlingame, California
- President: Sander L. Stadtler (2007 to 2017); Charles S. Syers (2001 to 2006); Irvin Ungar (1997 to 2001); George Gooche (1991 to 1997)
- Curator: Irvin Ungar (2001 to 2017)

The Arthur Szyk Society, active from 1991 to 2017, was a nonprofit organization founded to preserve the legacy of the artist Arthur Szyk (1894 – 1951). Through its newsletters, art history papers, traveling exhibition, and group tours abroad, The Society presented Szyk's works to audiences in the United States and worldwide.

== History ==
The Arthur Szyk Society was founded by George Gooche (1928 – 2009) in Orange County in 1991. In 1997, Gooche transferred The Society’s leadership to Irvin Ungar and moved its location to Burlingame, California. While active, The Arthur Szyk Society worked to keep Arthur Szyk in the public eye through a variety of services. Arthur Szyk’s daughter, Alexandra Szyk Bracie (1922 – 2016), served on The Society’s honorary board and authorized The Society to grant image licenses for use of Szyk art in articles, books, exhibitions, and films. In addition to image licensing, other services included loan facilitation for exhibitions, consultation for museums, access to archival materials by or related to Arthur Szyk, and publication of arts and educational study guides.

On behalf of The Arthur Szyk Society, Curator Irvin Ungar has been a keynote speaker for exhibition openings and public events at institutions including the Library of Congress in Washington, D.C.; the Deutsches Historisches Museum in Berlin, Germany; the Fine Arts Museums of San Francisco, and the Forest Hills Jewish Center in Queens, New York. Additionally, The Arthur Szyk Society served as collaborator for exhibitions, exhibition catalogues, and books about Arthur Szyk, including The Art and Politics of Arthur Szyk (United States Holocaust Memorial Museum, 2002), Arthur Szyk: Drawing Against National Socialism and Terror (Deutsches Historisches Museum Berlin, 2008) and Arthur Szyk: Soldier in Art (GILES, 2017).

In April 2017, The Magnes Collection of Jewish Art and Life at University of California, Berkeley became the official institutional steward of the Arthur Szyk collection and archives.

== Traveling exhibition ==
The Seymour Fromer Traveling Exhibition Program of The Arthur Szyk Society was named in honor of the late Seymour Fromer (1922 – 2009), who founded the Judah L. Magnes Museum (now The Magnes Collection of Jewish Art and Life) and served as Vice-President of The Arthur Szyk Society until his death.

The traveling exhibition, “Justice Illuminated: The Art of Arthur Szyk,” consisted of 32 color photo-mural panels which displayed a selection of Szyk’s works and provided information on the life and art of Arthur Szyk within the cultural and political movements of the first half of the 20th century. A web version of the exhibition remains as an archive.

Beginning in 2002, the traveling exhibition toured fourteen institutions, including Berkeley Hillel at UC Berkeley (2002), Hebrew Union College-Jewish Institute of Religion in New York (2006), the University of Northern Iowa (2007), Carnegie Mellon University Libraries (2009), and the National Catholic Center for Holocaust Education (2015). In 2005, the exhibition toured Warsaw, Kraków, and Łódź, Poland as part of the Society's Szyk Renaissance Poland Tour.

== Board of directors and honorary board ==
In 2017, the board of directors included President Sander L. Stadtler, Executive Vice-President Allison Chang, Vice-President Wayne Feinstein, President Emeritus Charles S. Syers, Secretary Pamela H. Stein, Curator Irvin Ungar, and members Alex Lauterbach and John F. Rothmann. Honorary board members have included Alexandra Szyk Bracie, Theodore Bikel, Reverend DeeDee M. Coleman, the Honorable Tom Lantos (U.S. Representative), Stanislaw Obirek, Father John T. Pawlikowski, Rabbi Jacob Pressman and Margie Pressman, Art Spiegelman, Paul Von Blum, and Elie Wiesel.

== Gallery ==
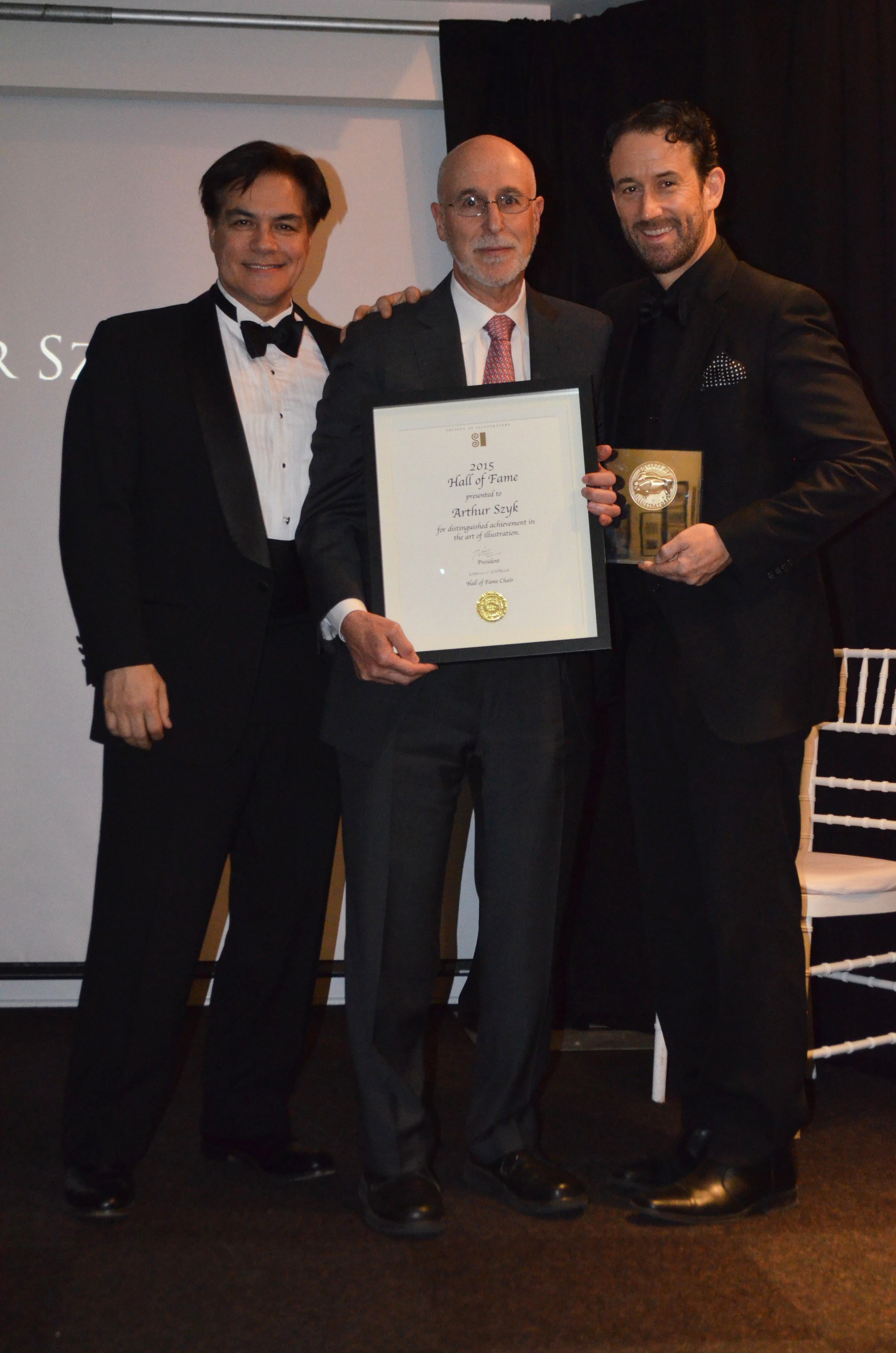
Irvin Ungar (center) accepting the Society of Illustrators' Hall of Fame award on behalf of artist Arthur Szyk in 2015

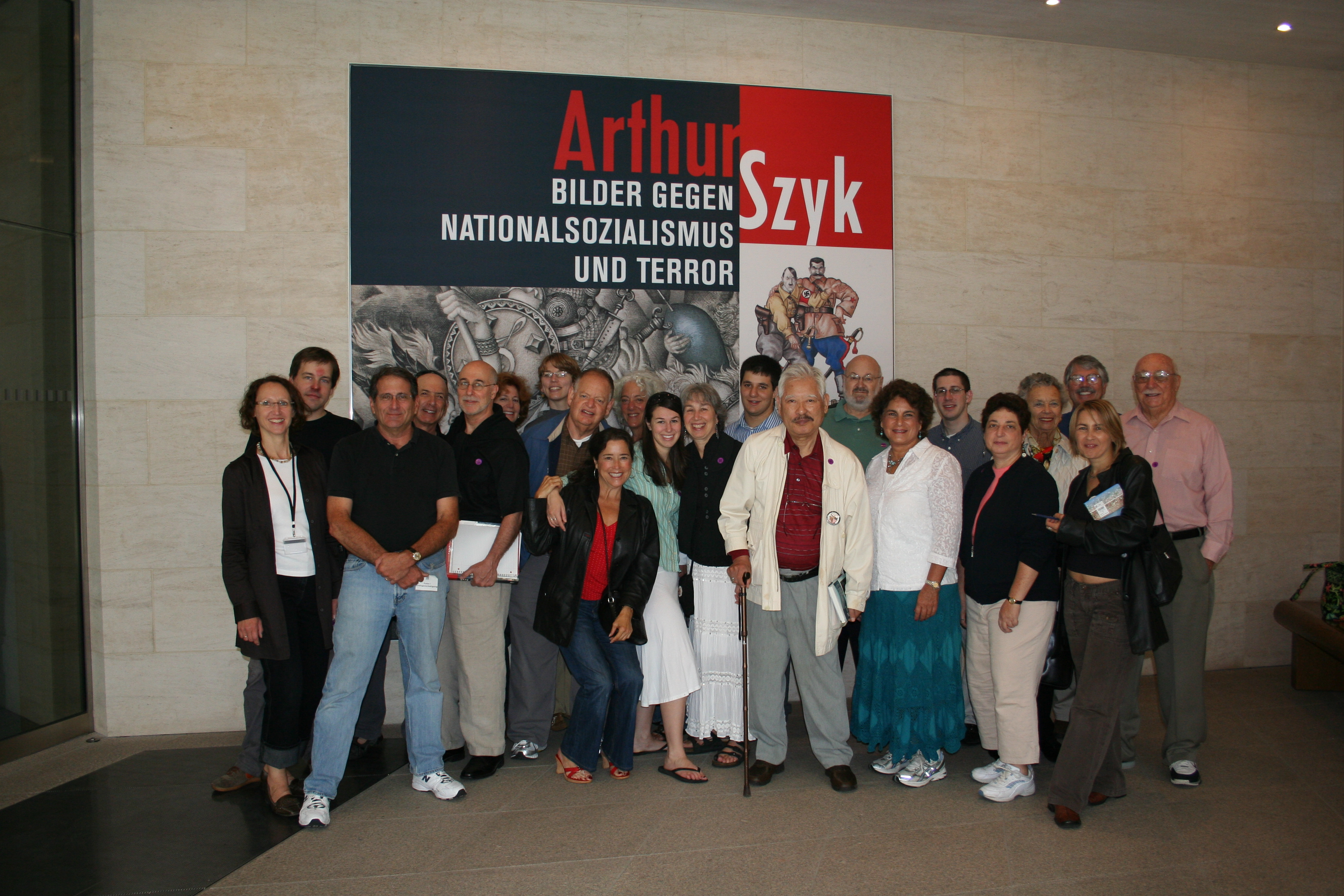
Deutsches Historisches Museum curators with Sandy Stadtler, Irvin Ungar, and members of The Arthur Szyk Society on the Szyk in Berlin Cultural Tour, 2008

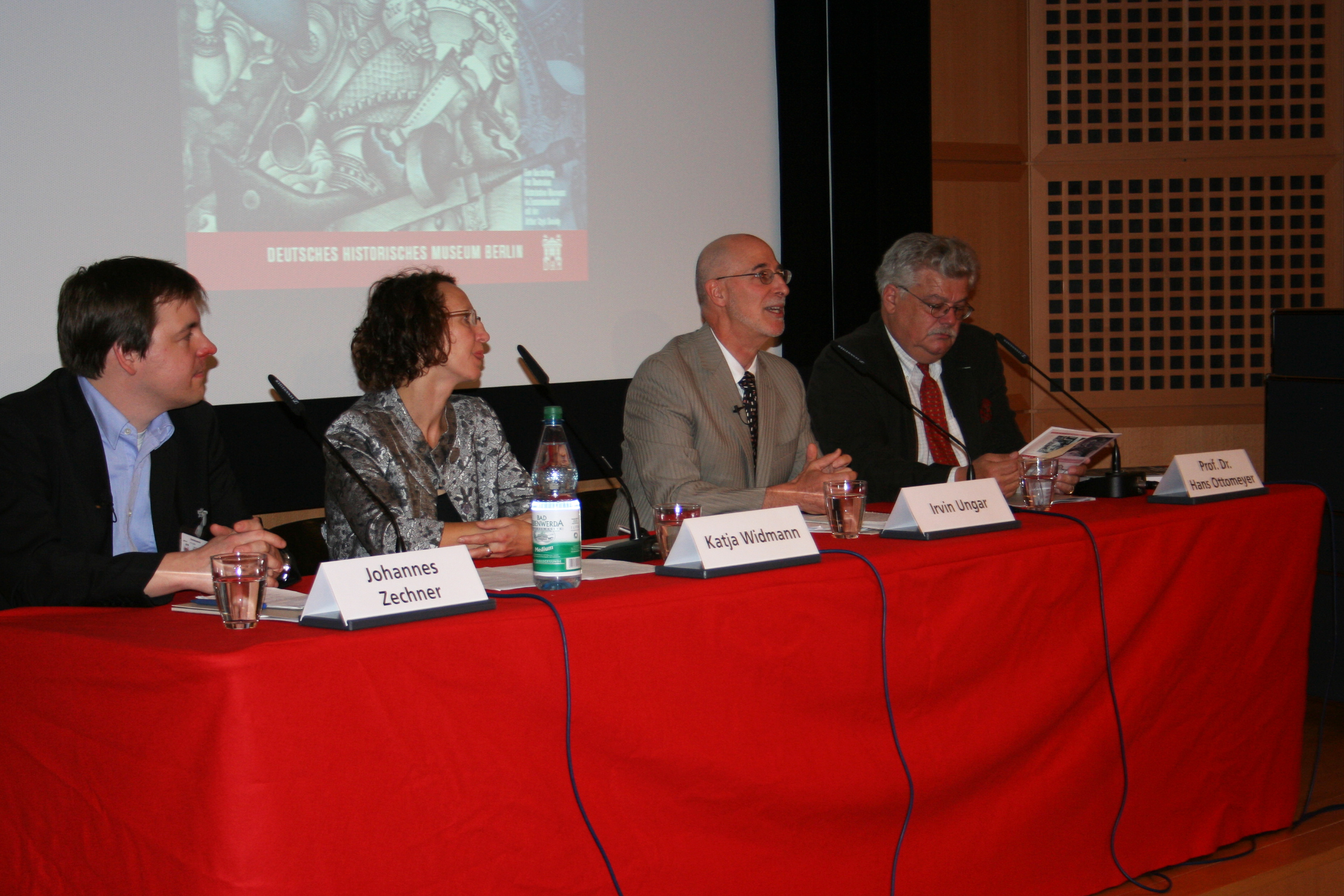
DHM Curators Johannes Zechner and Katja Widmann with Irvin Ungar and Hans Ottomeyer, Director of the Deutsches Historisches Museum, at a press conference for "Arthur Szyk: Drawing Against National Socialism and Terror" in 2008

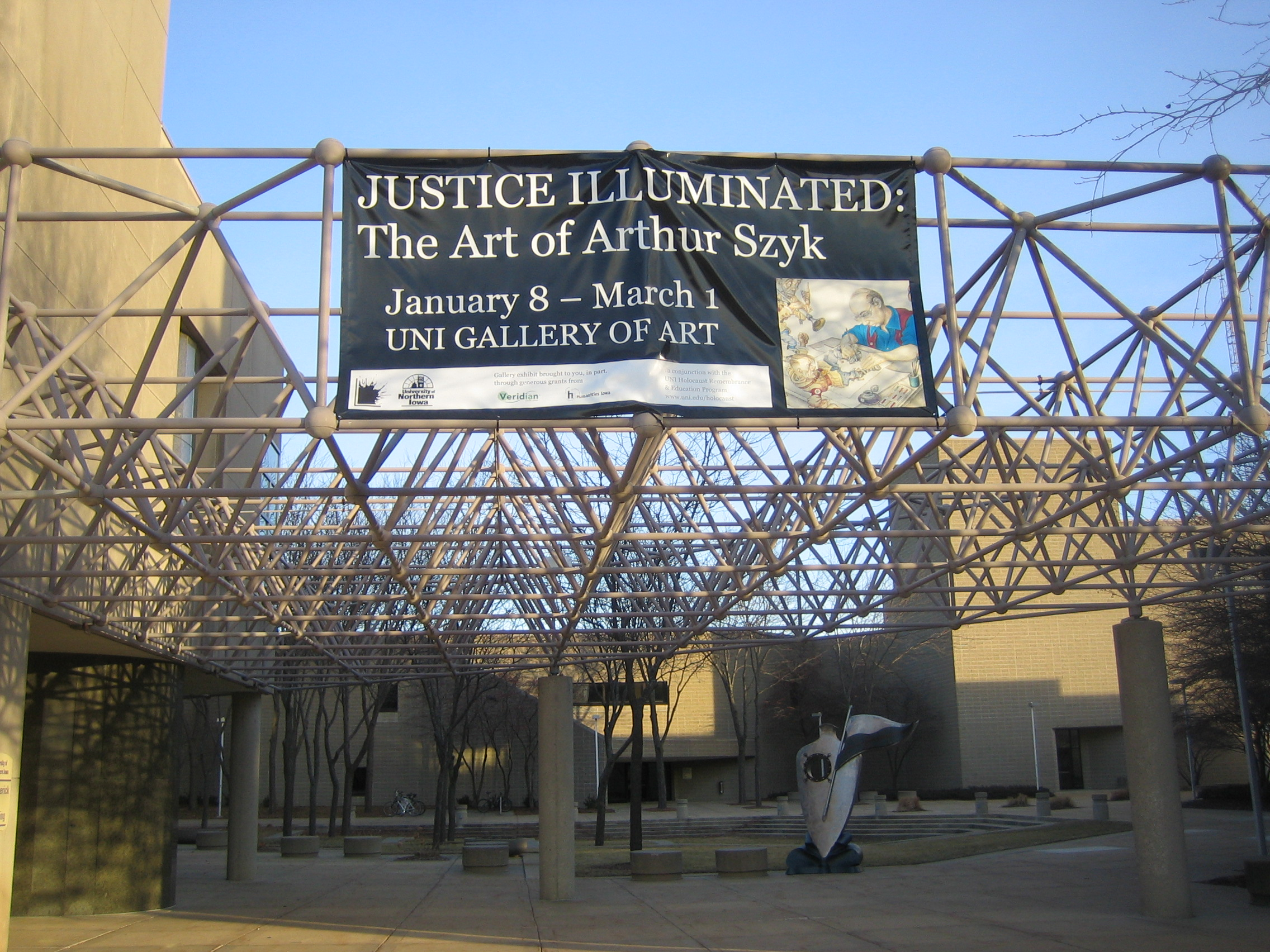
The "Justice Illuminated: The Art of Arthur Szyk" traveling exhibition at the University of Northern Iowa Gallery of Art, 2007

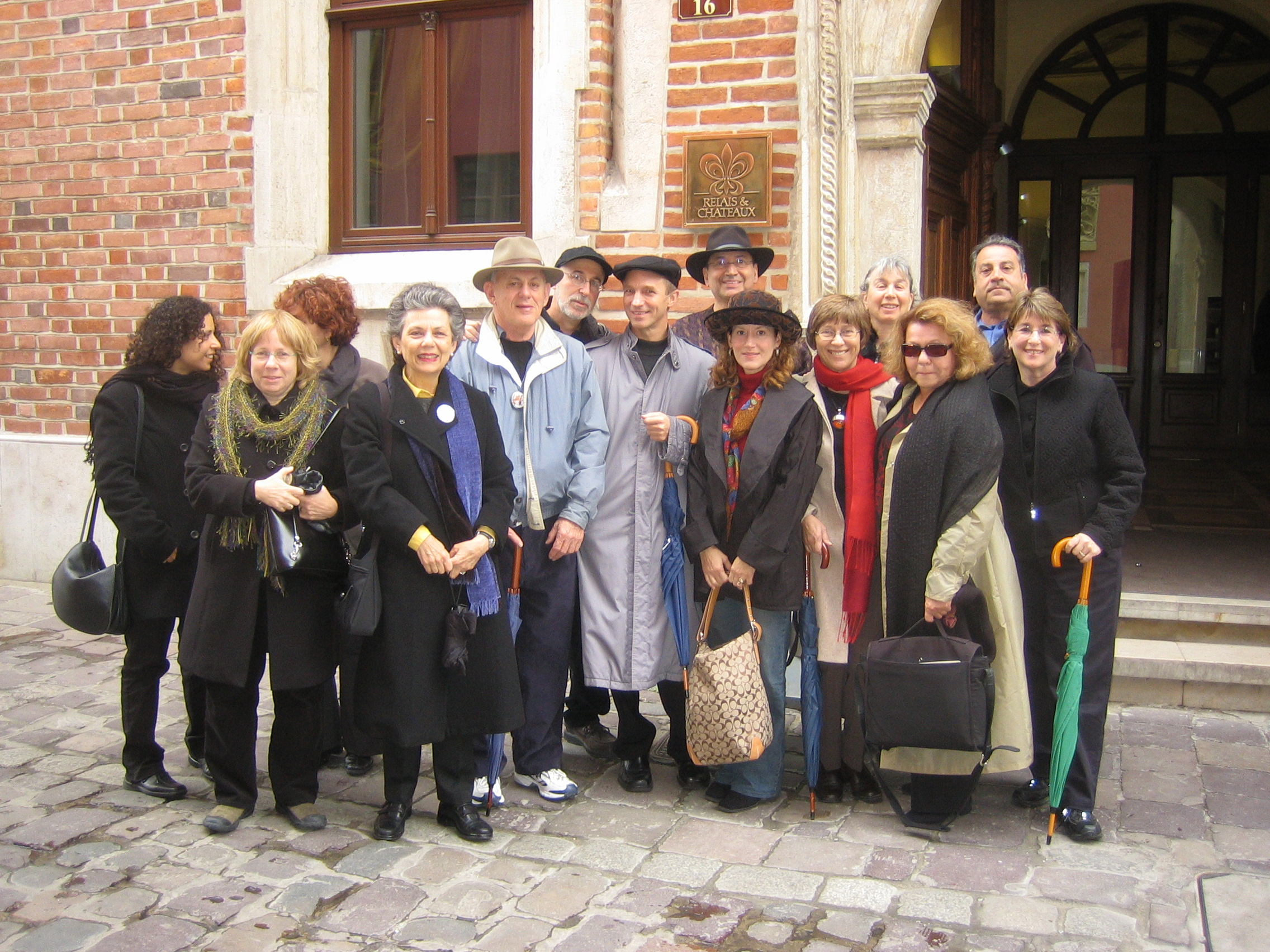
Szyk Society honorary board member Stanislaw Obirek (center, with umbrella) with Irvin Ungar and members of The Arthur Szyk Society in Poland for the Szyk Renaissance Tour, October 2005

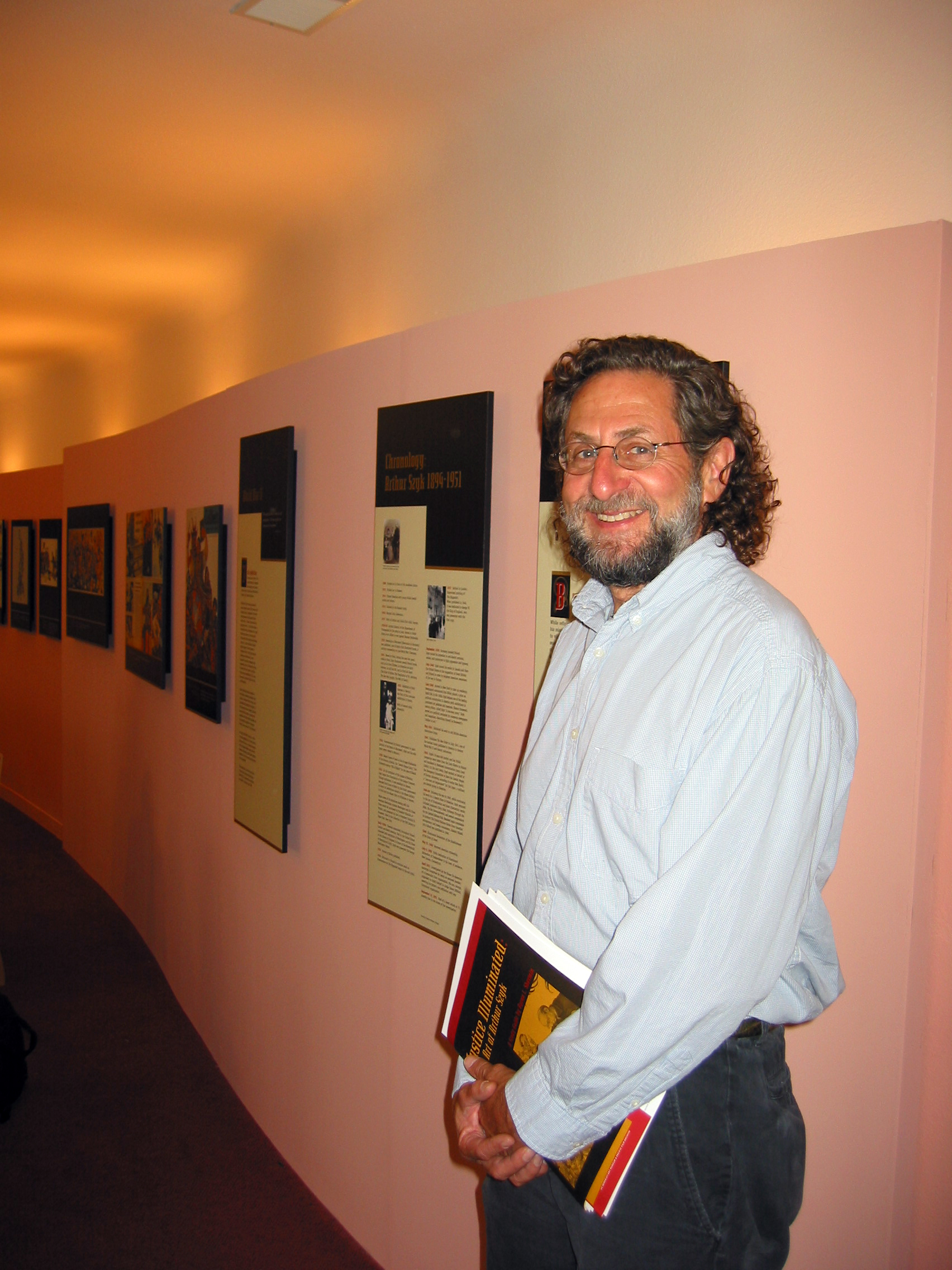
Exhibition designer Bill Chayes at Berkeley Hillel, the first-ever venue for The Arthur Szyk Society's traveling exhibition (2002)
