= Rylands Haggadah =

14th century Sephardi Passover Haggadah

- The John Rylands Library
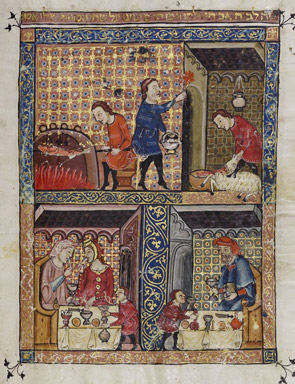
- The Preparation for the Seder (above) and The Celebration of the Seder (below)
- Type: Sephardi Haggadah
- Date: Mid-14th century
- Place of origin: Catalonia, Spain
- Language: Hebrew
- Author: Unknown
- Material: Parchment
- Size: Leaf height: 280 mm, width: 230 mm.
- Format: Codex
- Condition: Conserved between July 2011 and March 2012 by Steve Mooney at the John Rylands Library
- Script: Sephardi square script
- Previously kept: Enriqueta Rylands; James Ludovic Lindsay, 26th Earl of Crawford

The Rylands Haggadah is an illuminated Sephardi Passover Haggadah written and illuminated in Catalonia, Spain in the mid-14th century. It is generally regarded as one of the finest preserved and most ornate Haggadot in the world, and as an example of the "cross-fertilisation between Jewish and non-Jewish artists within the medium of manuscript illumination."

== Description ==
The Rylands Haggadah is an illuminated Passover Haggadah of the Sephardi rite dated to the mid-14th century, and produced in a style attributable to Catalonia, Spain. It contains piyyutim (liturgical poems) meant to be recited during Passover week and the Sabbath before Passover, as well as marginal commentary and a number full-page paintings. The illustrated cycle extends from the beginning of the Book of Exodus to the Passover sacrifice. The Biblical cycle is unconventionally followed by an illustration of a Passover seder.

The manuscript measures 28 centimetres (11 in) long by 23 centimetres (9 in) wide.

== Provenance and history ==
As is the case with the majority of Sephardi Haggadot of that period, the manuscript's provenance is uncertain. The identities of the patron, scribes, compilers, and illuminators who produced the work remain unknown. In 1901, the book was sold by James Lindsay, 26th Earl of Crawford of Haigh Hall, to Enriqueta Rylands. It was later bequeathed to The John Rylands Library.

Conservator Steve Mooney spent eight months restoring and conserving the manuscript, and it is now fully digitised.

From March to September 2012, Rylands Haggadah was on display at the Metropolitan Museum of Art in New York.

== Illustrations ==
The Haggadah contains thirteen full-page miniatures with a cycle of biblical illustrations, ending in a panel of four scenes representing the Passover celebration, as well as eleven illustrations of the text set in the margins. These illustrations include:

- The Burning Bush and the Miraculous Staff of Moses (right); The Healing of Moses's Arm, the Return to Egypt, and Zipporah Circumcising Her Son (left)
- The Miraculous Staff of Aaron and the Plague of Blood (right); The Plagues of Frogs and of Lice (left)
- The Rylands Haggadah: The Plagues of Wild Beasts and of Cattle Disease (right); The Plagues of Boils and of Hail (left)
- The Rylands Haggadah: The Plagues of Locusts and of Darkness (right); The Death of the Firstborn and the Looting of Treasures (left)
- The Rylands Haggadah: The Israelites Leaving Egypt and the Pharaoh's Pursuing Army (right); The Crossing of the Red Sea (left)
- The Preparation of the Paschal Lamb and the Marking of the Door (above); The Celebration of the Seder (below)

== Gallery ==
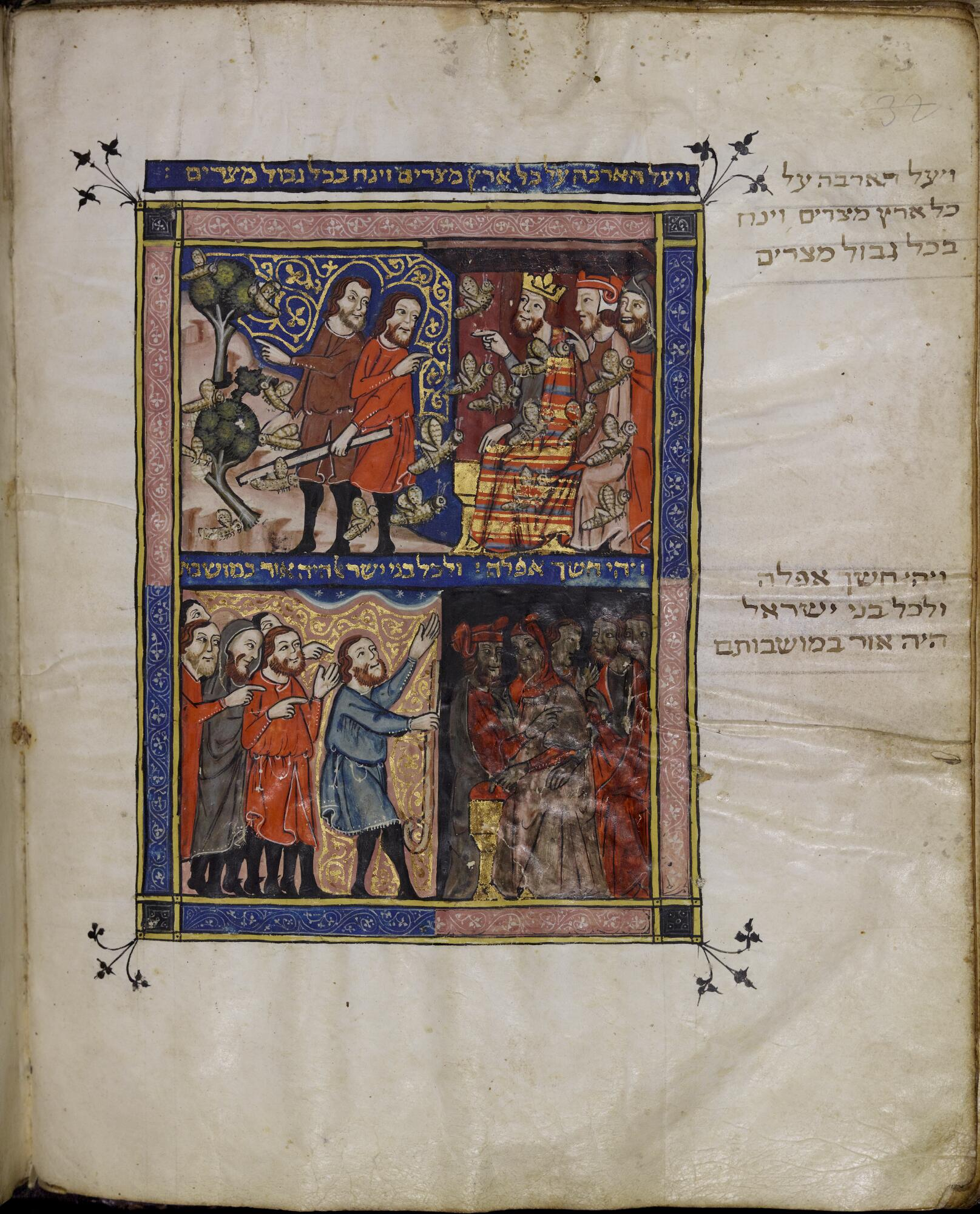
The Plagues of Locusts and of Darkness (right); The Death of the Firstborn and the Looting of Treasures (left)

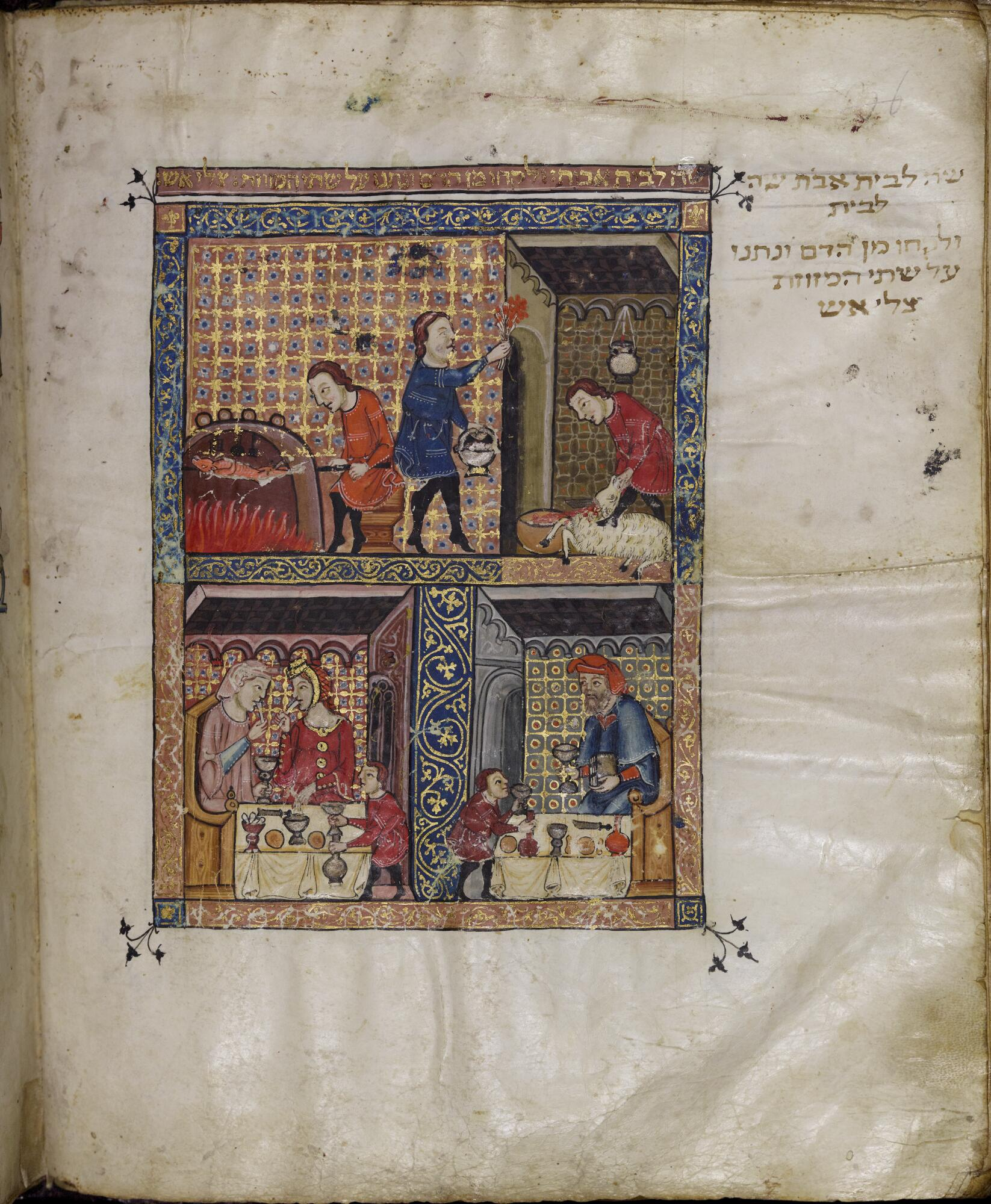
The Preparation of the Paschal Lamb and the Marking of the Door (above); The Celebration of the Seder (below)
