= Leon Israel =

American cartoonist (1887–1955)

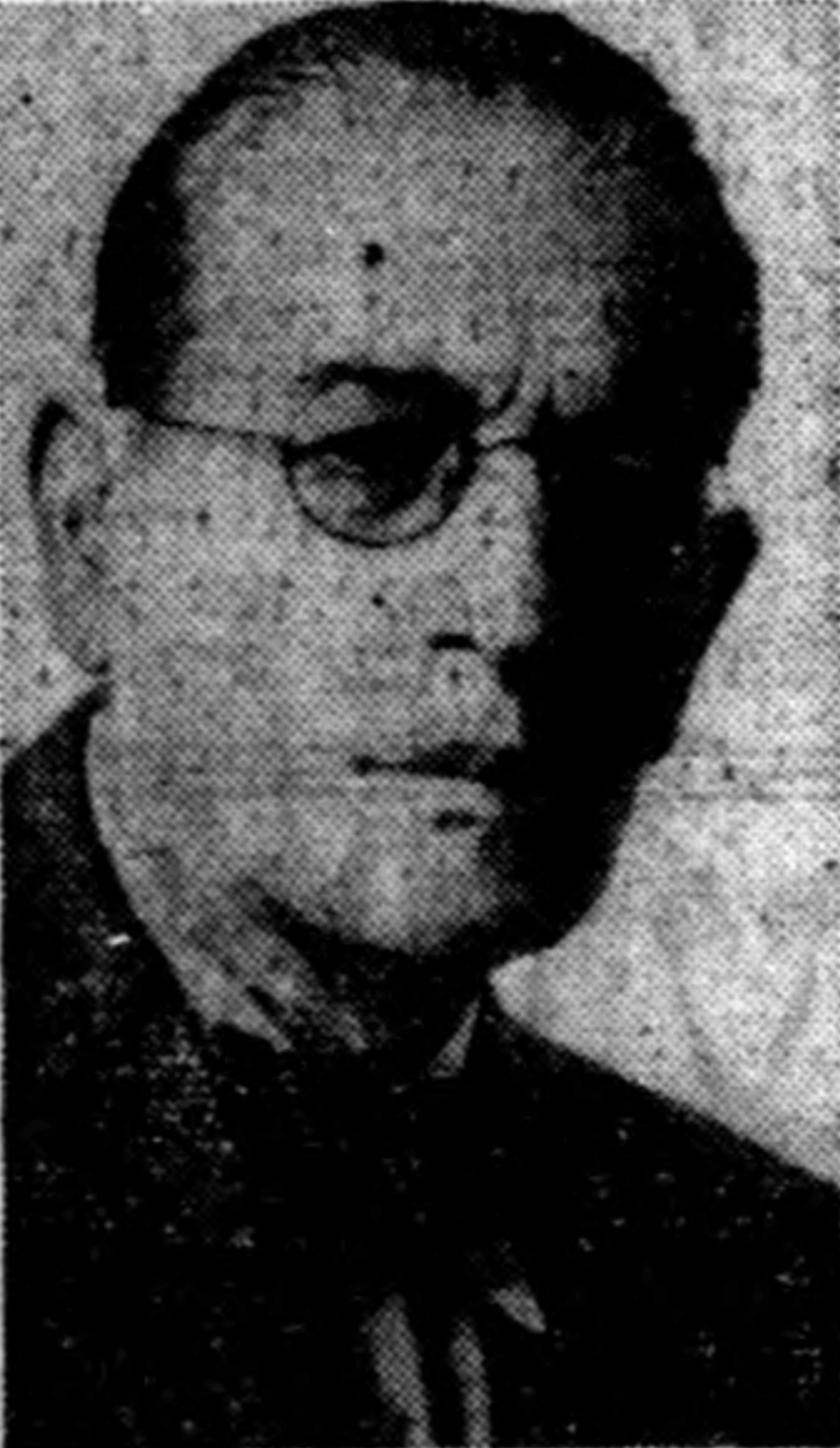
- Portrait from a 1955 obituary
- Born: December 12, 1887; Pinsk, Russian Empire
- Died: January 12, 1955 (aged 67); New York City, United States

Leon Israel (Yiddish: לעאָן איזראַעל; December 12, 1887 – January 12, 1955), known under the pseudonym "Lola" (לאָלאַ), was an American artist. Born and raised in Pinsk, he immigrated to the United States in 1905. He worked there as a famous cartoonist and painter.

== Early life ==
Leon Israel was born on December 12, 1887 in Pinsk in the Russian Empire, modern-day Belarus. He was educated both in religious schools as well as a Russian school. He came to the United States in 1905, when he was 18.

== Career ==
In 1909 Israel published his first caricature, that of Jacob Gordin, for the weekly magazine Der groyser kundes under his pseudonym "Lola". He also illustrated various Yiddish books, and in 1953 he published a picturebook, Di amoliker ist said in bilder (The East Side of Yesteryear in Pictures), which depicts immigrants in Manhattan during the early 20th century.

== Legacy ==
After his death in 1955, The New York Times produced an obituary of Israel. He was cited by future Jewish-American artist Eli Valley as an influence. The 2020 book How Yiddish Changed America and How America Changed Yiddish, an anthology of American Yiddish literature, describes Israel as a "prolific and talented cartoonist".

== Gallery ==
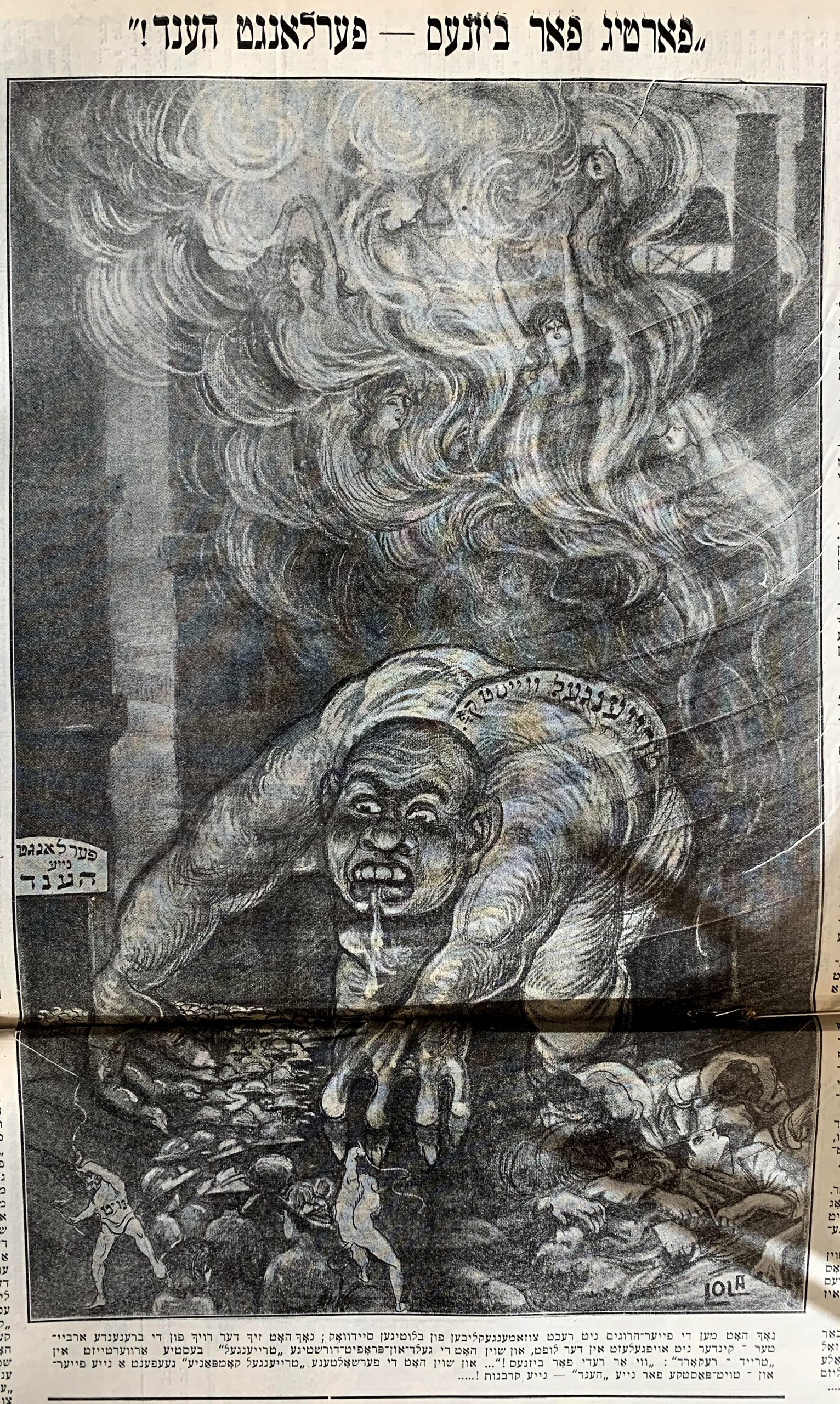
"Open for Business – Help Wanted!": A caricature of factory-owners after the Triangle Shirtwaist Factory fire, 1911

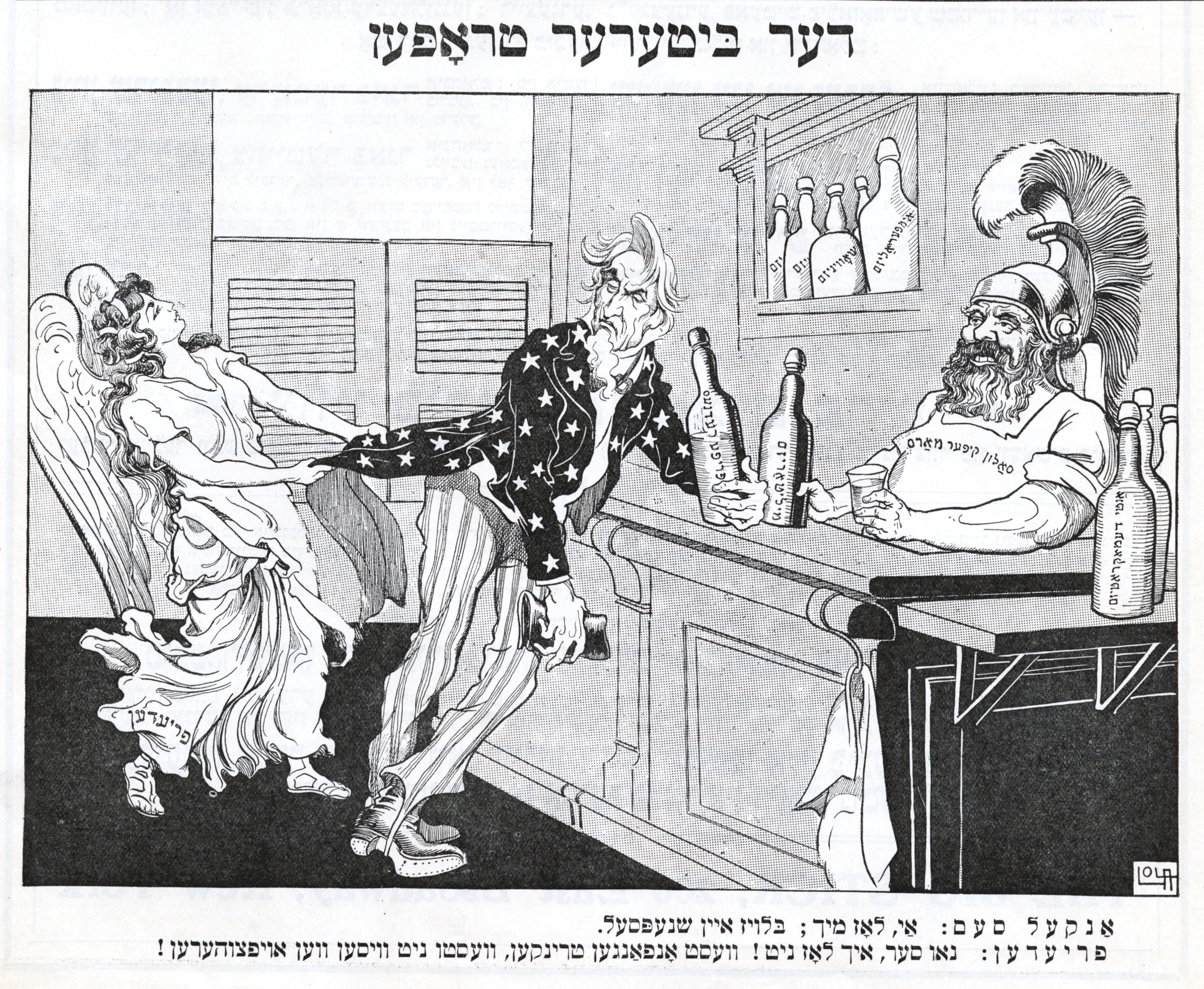
Lady Peace tries to pull the United States away from the saloon of the war god Mars, an allegory for the World War I, 1915

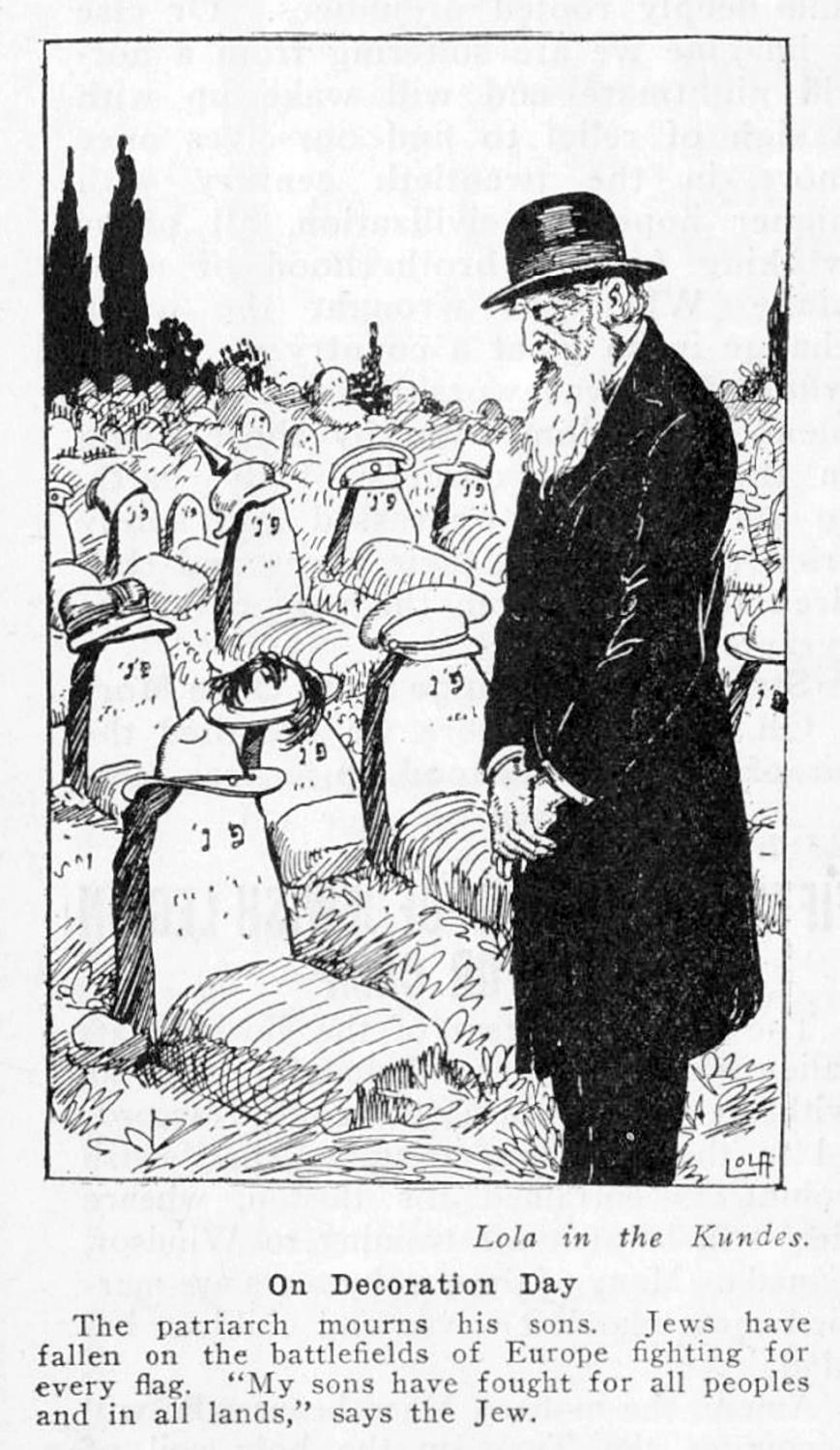
A Jewish father mourns his sons after World War I, 1918.

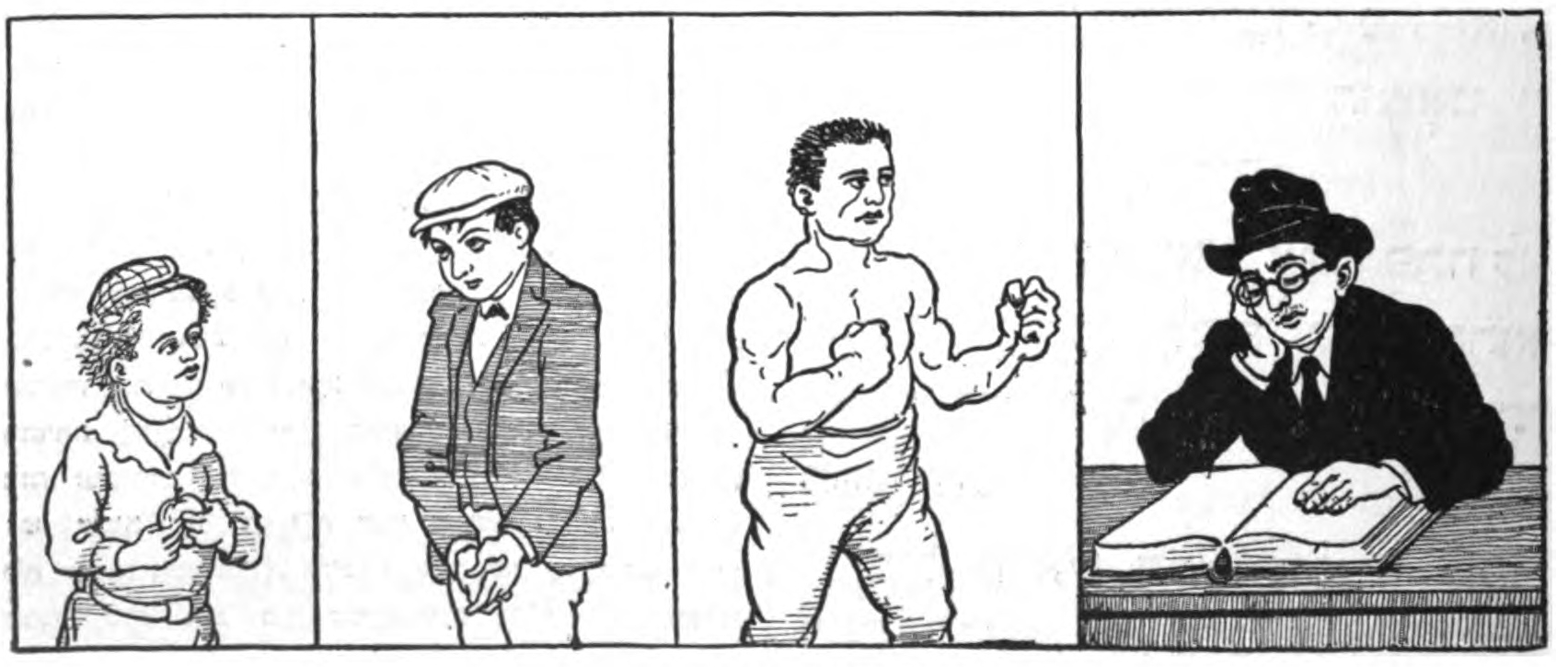
Illustration of the Jewish parable of "The Four Sons", 1920
