= The Four Sons =

Jewish parable of four types of sons

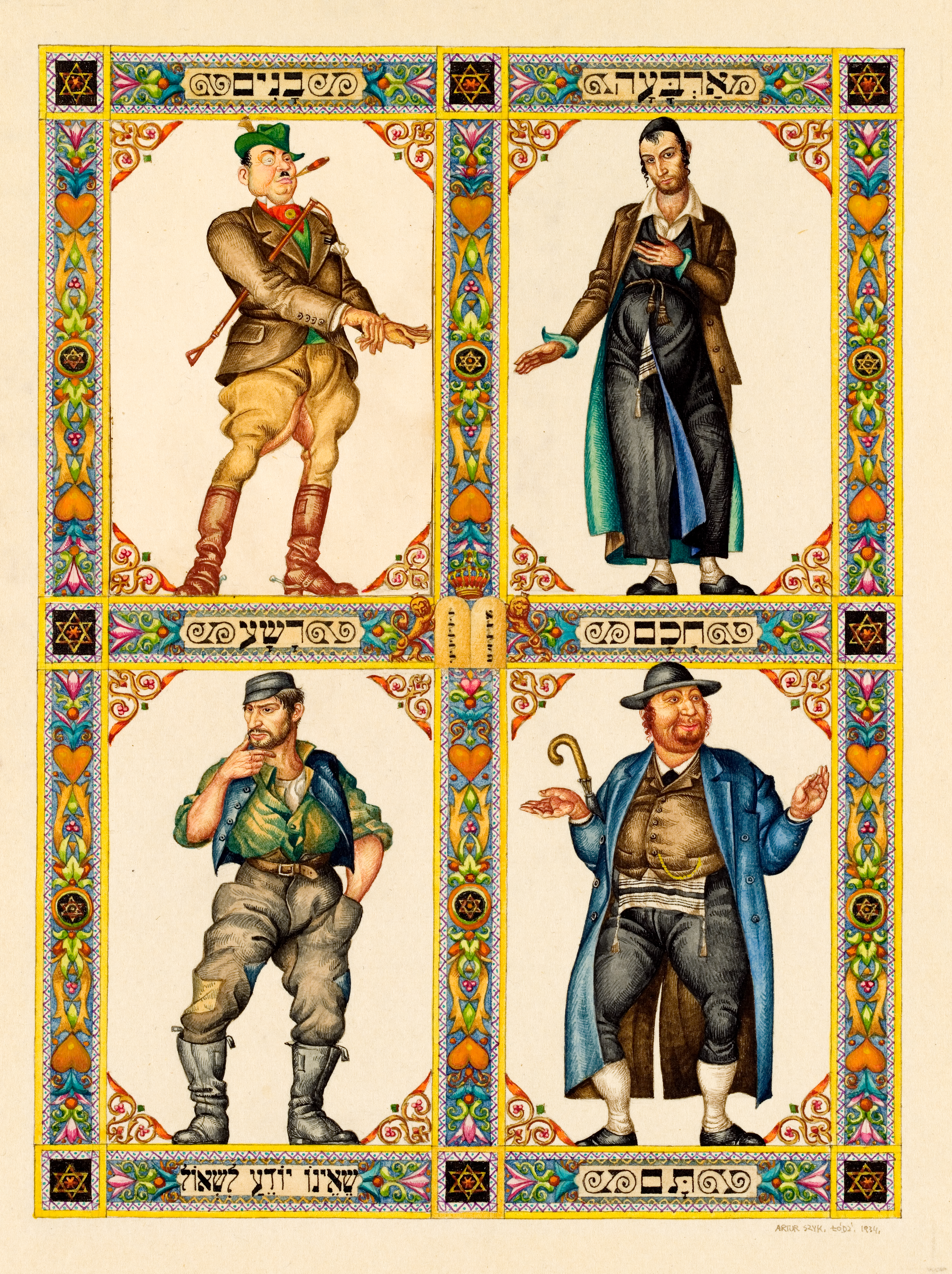
A modern adaptation from the Szyk Haggadah by Arthur Szyk for the figures of the four sons, Lodz, 1934 (clockwise from top-left): the wicked, wise, simple, and the one who does not know how to ask.

The Four Sons (Hebrew: ארבעה בנים) is a Midrash that appears in several places in the literature of the Sages and was established in the Passover Haggadah The Midrash details four types of sons: wise, wicked, simple, and one who does not know how to ask, about whom, according to the Midrash, the Torah spoke, in the commandment to tell the story of the Exodus from Egypt, and divided the types of answers, suitable for each one of them.

== The Questions ==
In the Torah, verses that command to tell the story of the Exodus from Egypt appear four times. The Sages interpreted each of these four verses as corresponding to four types of sons:

- Wise (חכם): asks "What are the testimonies, statutes, and laws of Passover that we are commanded to follow?". The detail in the question shows the son's wisdom in Torah.
- Wicked (רשע): asks "What does this [Passover] service mean to you?". Here the son associates the labor only with you and not himself, and "since he excluded himself from the community, he denied the fundamental principle" and the son asking is wicked.
- Simple (תם): asks "What is this?". This question is associated with the simple son because it expresses curiosity in a simple way.
- The one who does not know how to ask (שאינו יודע לשאול): here there isn't a question at all but a command to tell the son even if he does not ask, therefore the verse is associated with the one who does not know how to ask.

== The Answers ==
According to the Midrash appearing in Mekhilta of Rabbi Ishmael and in the Haggadah, the Torah commands a different approach to each of the sons according to his question:

- The wise son is answered with the laws of Passover, that "one does not conclude after the Passover meal with the Afikoman".
- To the wicked son, one answers with a response intended to blunt his teeth and to say to him "because of this did the Lord do for me when I came forth out of Egypt", for me and not for him, for "had he been there, he would not have been redeemed".
- The simple son receives the concise answer - "with a mighty hand the Lord brought us out of Egypt, from the house of bondage".
- Regarding one who does not know how to ask, our sages commanded to open for him so that he may ask and to tell him.

And this is the language of the author of the Haggadah: In the Jerusalem Talmud, the answers for the wise and the simple son are reversed: the wise son is answered with the general response that "with a mighty hand the Lord brought us out of Egypt, from the house of bondage", and the simple son receives all the laws of Passover, so "that he may not stand from this group and enter another group".

== Order of the Sons ==
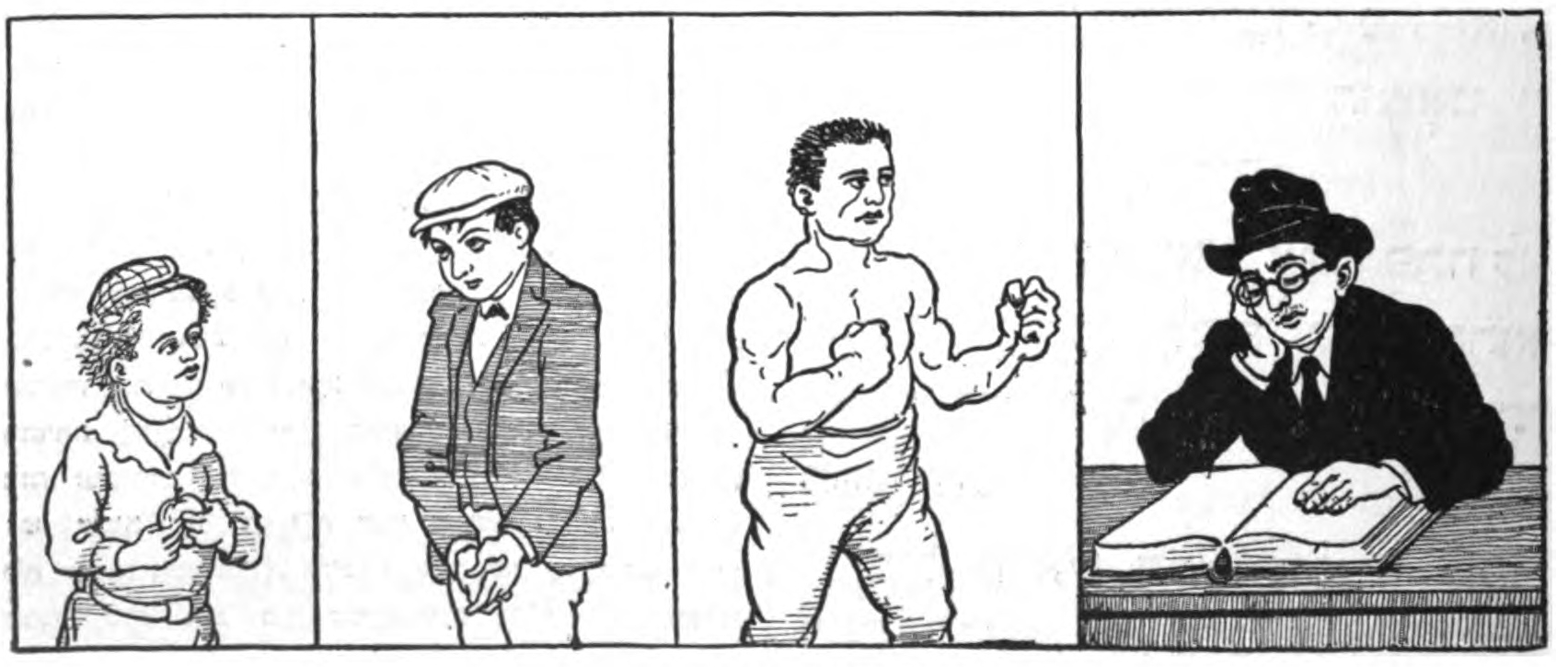
The sons in an illustration by Leon Israel, 1920 (right to left): the wise, wicked, simple, and the one who does not know how to ask.

The sons in the Haggadah do not appear in the order of the verses brought in the Torah, there are several interpretations for this order:

- The Abudraham explains in a simple manner that the sons were ranked according to their wisdom - the wise and the wicked are both already mature in their opinions, but the distinguished wise is written first, followed by the simple who is not yet fully mature, and the one who does not know how to ask who does not understand at all.
- According to Kabbalah, the four sons correspond to four of the Sefirot that correspond to the four legs of the Throne of Glory: Chesed, Gevurah, Tiferet and Malkhut respectively, and therefore they are arranged according to the order of the Sefirot.

== In Culture ==
The four sons are presented in Naomi Shemer's poem as "The Four Brothers," in which they leave the Haggadah and each one goes his own way, and each one meets a partner who is similar to him in character (except for the one who does not know how to ask, whose partner is mentioned only by her external appearance), and they return with their partners to the Haggadah.

== Characteristics of the Sons ==
Gad Ben-Ami Zarfati suggested that the four sons reflect a combination of two character traits - intelligence and fear of Heaven - according to the following table.

	Possesses fear of Heaven	Lacks fear of Heaven
Possesses intelligence	Wise	Wicked
Lacks intelligence	Simple	Does not know how to ask

== The "Fifth Son" in modern liturgy ==
The concept of a Fifth Son*(or "Fifth Child") is a 20th-century liturgical addition to the traditional Four Sons narrative in the Haggadah. Unlike the four children physically present at the Passover Seder, the Fifth Son represents those who are absent due to tragedy, persecution, or communal disengagement.

=== Historical interpretations ===
- The Holocaust (The Martyred Son): Following World War II, many Haggadot introduced a Fifth Son to memorialize the 1.5 million children murdered during the Holocaust. In this tradition, an empty chair is often left at the table as a silent tribute to those who did not survive to ask a question.
- Soviet Jewry (The Silenced Son): During the Soviet Jewry movement (1960s–1980s), the Fifth Son symbolized Jews behind the Iron Curtain who were prohibited from practicing their faith. Rituals such as the "Matzah of Hope" were added to Seders to acknowledge those who were "refused" the right to attend.
- Communal Disengagement (The Absent Son): In a 1957 Passover message, Rabbi Menachem Mendel Schneerson, the Lubavitcher Rebbe, argued that while the Haggadah's four sons are all present, this fifth son is the most critical challenge because they are entirely unaware of the festival. Rabbi Jonathan Sacks later adapted these teachings, noting that the "Fifth Son" philosophy mandates proactive outreach to ensure no Jew is left behind. This theology is widely cited as the primary driver for Chabad's global expansion and institutional mission.

== Sources ==
- Francis, Fred O. (1974). "The Baraita of the Four Sons". Journal of the American Academy of Religion. XLII (2): 280–297. doi:10.1093/jaarel/XLII.2.280. ISSN 0002-7189.
- Hendel, Russell Jay (2004). "The Educational Pedagogy of the Four Sons". Shofar. 22 (4). Purdue University Press: 94–106. ISSN 0882-8539. JSTOR 42943721.
