= Four Daughters =

Four Daughters may refer to:

- Four Daughters (1938 film), directed by Michael Curtiz
- Four Daughters (2023 film), directed by Kaouther Ben Hania
- Four Daughters of God, medieval personification of the virtues of mercy, truth, justice and peace
