= Byron Sherwin =

American rabbi and scholar

Rabbi Byron Lee Sherwin (February 18, 1946 – May 22, 2015) was a Jewish scholar and author with expertise in theology, inter-religious dialogue, mysticism and Jewish ethics.

== Background and career ==
A rabbi in the Conservative Judaism movement, he trained at the Jewish Theological Seminary with Abraham Joshua Heschel. A graduate of Columbia University, he earned a Ph.D. in the History of Culture from the University of Chicago. Sherwin served as a senior administrator at the Spertus Institute and as Distinguished Service Professor of Jewish Philosophy and Mysticism. He also directed the Joseph Cardinal Bernardin Center for the Study of Eastern European Jewry. Sherwin was reportedly "The first rabbi in 400 years to lecture at the Catholic seminary in Bialystok, and the first Jew ever to lecture on Judaism at the University of Warsaw." He was the author of dozens of books and articles in Jewish studies.

"In 1995, he was awarded the "Officer's Order of Merit" by President Lech Wałęsa of The Republic of Poland and in 1996 received an honorary Doctor of Hebrew Letters from the Jewish Theological Seminary." He also received the 1992 "Man of Reconciliation Award" from the Polish Council of Christians and Jews. He died at the age of 69 in 2015.

== Selected works ==
- Crafting the Soul: Creating Your Life as a Work of Art, 1998
- The Cubs and the Kabbalist: How A Kabbalah-Master Helped the Chicago Cubs Win Their First World Series Since 1908 (novel)
- Faith Finding Meaning: A Theology of Judaism, 2009
- Golems Among Us: How a Jewish Legend Can Help Us Navigate the Biotech Century, 2004
- The Golem Legend: Origins and Implications, 1985
- How To Be a Jew: Ethical Teachings of Judaism, 1992 (co-edited with Seymour J. Cohen)
- Jewish Ethics for the Twenty-First Century: Living in the Image of God, 1999
- John Paul II and Interreligious Dialogue, 1999 (co-edited with Harold Kasimow)
- Kabbalah: An Introduction to Jewish Mysticism, Rowman & Littlefield:
- The Life Worth Living: Faith in Action, 2009
- Mystical Theology and Social Dissent: The Life and Works of Judah Loew of Prague, 1982
- Jerzy Kosinski: Literary Alarmclock, 1981
- Sparks Amidst the Ashes: The Spiritual Legacy of Polish Jewry
- The Szyk Haggadah: Translation and Commentary, 2008 (with Irvin Ungar)
- Toward a Jewish Theology
- Why Be Good? Seeking Our Best Selves in a Challenging World, 1998
- Workers of Wonders: A Model for Effective Religious Leadership from Scripture to Today, 2004

== Sources ==
- Spertus Institute for Jewish Learning and Leadership
- David Scott, "At Auschwitz, looking for ‘a lost Atlantis’" Our Sunday Visitor (September 19, 1993)
- Loyola brief bio
