= Bedikah =

In Judaism, bedikah (בדיקה, "inspection", pl. bedikot) may refer to:

- checking if a niddah (menstruant woman) has stopped menstruating
- checking if shechita (animal slaughter) has been properly carried out

== See also ==
- Bedikas chametz
