= Fast of the Firstborn =

Fast day in Judaism, preceding Passover

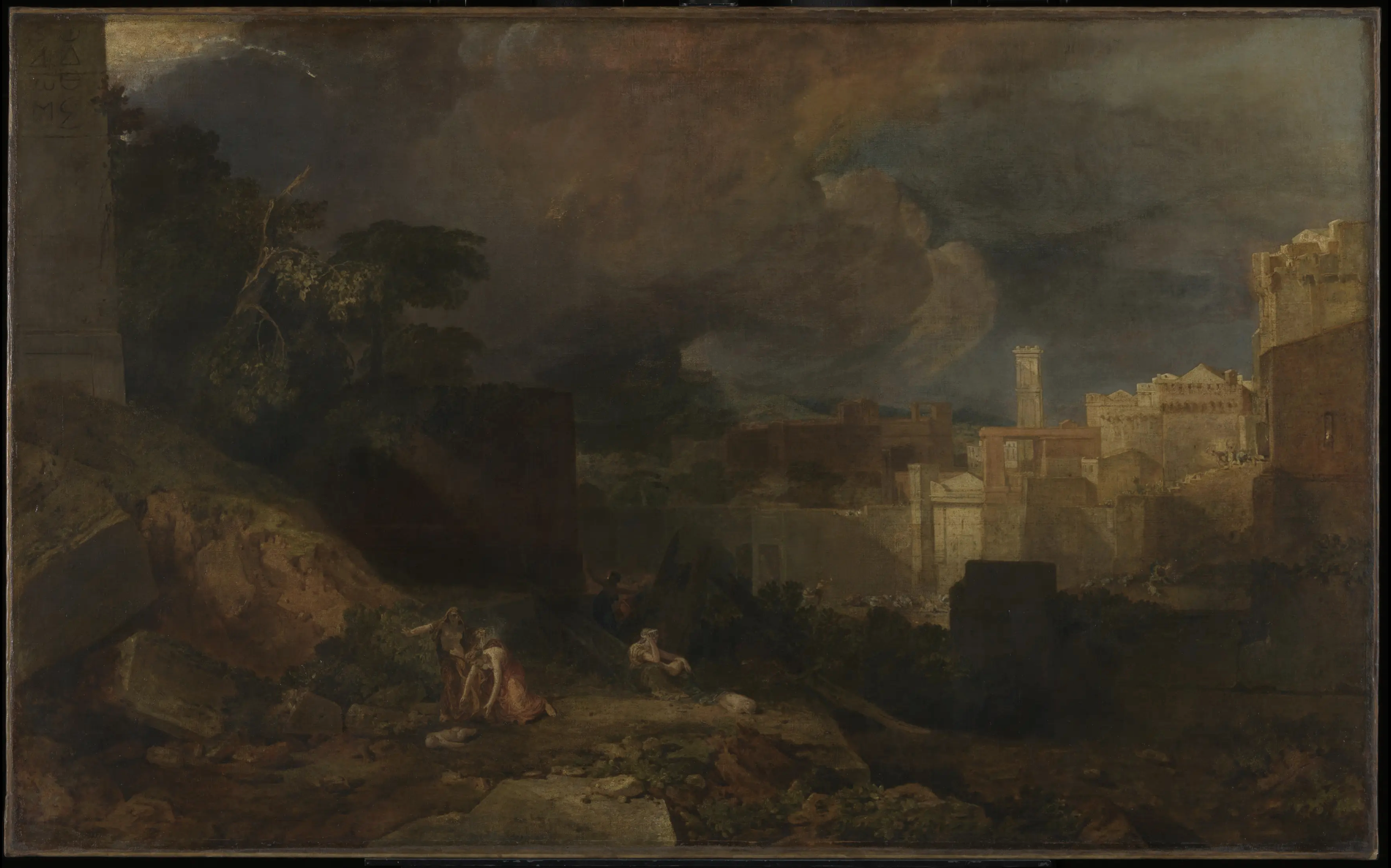
- J. M. W. Turner's depiction of the Plague of the Firstborn (The Tenth Plague of Egypt, 1802)
- Official name: Hebrew: תַעֲנִית בְּכוֹרוֹת, romanized: taʿăniṯ bəḵoroṯ or תַעֲנִית בְּכוֹרים taʿăniṯ bəḵorim Translation: "Fast of the firstborn"
- Observed by: Firstborn of Jewish families
- Type: Judaism
- Significance: This fast commemorates the salvation of the Israelite firstborns during the Plague of the Firstborn
- Observances: fasting
- Begins: 14 Nisan at dawn (12th day of Nisan whenever Passover begins on Sunday)
- Ends: 14 Nisan (or the 12th day as above)
- 2026 date: April 1
- Related to: Passover

Fast of the Firstborn (Hebrew: תַעֲנִית בְּכוֹרוֹת, romanized: taʿăniṯ bəḵoroṯ or תַעֲנִית בְּכוֹרים taʿăniṯ bəḵorim) is a unique fast day in Judaism, which usually falls on the day before Passover (i.e., 14 Nisan, a month in the Hebrew calendar; Passover begins on 15 Nisan). In modern times, the fast is usually broken at a siyum celebration (typically made after Shaharit), which, according to the prevailing custom, creates an atmosphere of rejoicing that overrides the requirement to continue the fast. Unlike all other Jewish fast days, only firstborn children must fast on this day.

This fast commemorates the salvation of the Israelite firstborns during the Plague of the Firstborn (according to the Book of Exodus, the tenth of the ten plagues wrought upon Biblical Egypt before the Exodus), when, according to Exodus (12:29): "In the middle of the night יהוה struck down all the [male] first-born in the land of Egypt, from the first-born of Pharaoh who sat on the throne to the first-born of the captive who was in the dungeon, and all the first-born of the cattle. "

== Origins ==
The primary source quoted for this custom is Tractate Soferim 21:3, where it is stated that firstborns fast "in commemoration of the miracle that they were saved from the Plague of the Firstborn". Asher ben Jehiel and Aaron ben Jacob ha-Kohen quotes the Jerusalem Talmud as an additional source for the fast, though the same passage can also be understood to mean that firstborns do not fast.

The Shulchan Aruch records the custom of fasting. However, Moses Isserles records that some people instead "redeem" the fast. Later commentaries suggest that this redemption could be done by holding a siyum or by giving charity. Yosef Eliyahu Henkin suggested that since the custom is absent from the Babylonian Talmud, it is not universally binding but rather depends on current practice, allowing the current practice of replacing the fast with a siyum or charity (Henkin preferred charity).

== Meaning of the fast ==
Fasts in Judaism can have a number of purposes, including atonement for sins; commemorative mourning, and commemorative gratitude (see Ta'anit).

The Fast of the Firstborn incorporates commemorative gratitude for salvation from the Plague of the Firstborn, as detailed above.

According to Rabbi Jacob Emden, the Fast of the Firstborn also commemorates the salvation of the Jews from the plot of Haman. This is because Haman advanced his plot on the thirteenth of Nisan, and Esther reacted by instructing all Jews of Susa to undertake a three-day fast beginning the next day, the fourteenth of Nisan. For this reason, even some non-firstborns maintain the custom of fasting on the fourteenth of Nisan.

According to Shlomo Zalman Auerbach, the Fast of the Firstborn also includes an aspect of mourning: firstborns fast to mourn the loss of their priestly status which had initially been granted them on the fourteenth of Nisan. Furthermore, during the Temple period, this loss was most profoundly felt on the fourteenth of Nisan, which was the busiest day of the year for the kohenim and Levites.

Yehuda Grünwald, the rabbi of Satu Mare and student of Avraham Shmuel Binyamin Sofer, suggests that the firstborn Israelites fasted in trepidation in advance of the Plague of the Firstborn; despite a divine guarantee of safety, they felt a need to fast in repentance to achieve greater divine protection. Grunwald thus posits that this was the precedent for the Fast of the Firstborn.

== Qualifications for fasting ==
There is disagreement among the early halakhic authorities (authoritative scholars of Jewish law) as to who qualifies as a firstborn for purposes of the Fast of the Firstborn. All authorities agree, however, to the conditions of halakhic adulthood (generally speaking, this is 12 years for a female and 13 years for a male) and sanity, preconditions for all positive mitzvot, to obligate one to fast. (Other rare conditions, such as deaf-muteness, also exempt one from positive mitzvot).

According to Joel Sirkis, Alexander Suslin, and arguably Yaakov ben Moshe Levi Moelin, both men and women are obligated to fast. This is based upon the midrash, which states that both men and women among the firstborn Egyptians perished in the plague. Following a precedent common in Jewish commemorative rituals, the above authorities ruled that all those who were miraculously saved should participate in commemoration (see also Pesahim 108b). Since both men and women died from the plague, all firstborn Jewish men and women alive at that time are considered to have been miraculously saved. Moses Isserles and the Vilna Gaon rule that women are exempt from the fast. As the Book of Exodus (13:12–15) mentions the biblical commandment of Redemption of the Firstborn as commemorative of the salvation of Jewish firstborns in Egypt, and as this command only applies to firstborn males, Isserlies and the Vilna Gaon rule similarly that only males are obligated to fast. Traditional practice is that only males fast.

While a firstborn to both parents, or a firstborn to only the mother, must fast according to all authorities, there is a dispute among the early halakhic authorities regarding the status of a firstborn to only the father. The Shulchan Aruch codifies that a firstborn to only the father is obligated to fast, while most printings of the Arba'ah Turim indicate that such a person would be exempt. Common practice follows the Shulchan Aruch.

Typically, if the oldest in the family died, the next oldest is not required to fast. However, if the oldest child had died within 30 days of birth, the next oldest is required to fast. Yechezkel Landau maintains that this only applies if the oldest child had been born prematurely or was not born viable.

Many authorities, including Isserlies, note the custom that the father of a firstborn should fast on his child's behalf until the child reaches halakhic adulthood. The Rema rules that if the father is a firstborn himself, the mother should fast on behalf of the child. The Mateh Moshe and Yaakov ben Moshe dispute this and rule in such a scenario that the mother need not fast. Avraham Gombiner ruled that it is appropriate to follow the lenient opinion if fasting causes the mother excessive discomfort or if she is pregnant or nursing, but he adds that a mother who begins following the former opinion must maintain that custom and fast in subsequent years.

Jacob ben Joseph Reischer ruled that the above-cited custom of the father fasting for the child goes into effect as soon as the child is born, except where the child is born after chatzot ha'laila (halakhic midnight, which generally corresponds to solar midnight) on the 14th of Nisan of that year. (Since the child had not yet been born by the equivalent time that the Plague of the Firstborn had occurred in Egypt, the father need not fast for his child until the following year) Nathaniel Weil disagreed. He wrote that the custom only goes into effect from the time the child is 30 days old. This relates, again, to the command to redeem the firstborn, which does not go into effect until the child is 30 days old.

There is some discussion among the posqim (halakhic authorities) regarding whether a firstborn born through caesarean section is required to observe this fast, given that he is not obligated in the Redemption of the Firstborn. Jacob Reischer (470:2) suggests that such a firstborn may be required to fast, while Yaakov Chaim Sofer (470:3) rules that he need not fast. To circumvent this question, as well as a dispute regarding a firstborn proselyte, Yosef Shalom Elyashiv suggests that such firstborns participate in a seudat mitzvah.

== Duration of the fast ==
As with most Jewish fast days, the fast begins at dawn. The common practice is that it is subsequently broken in the morning at a seudat mitzvah (celebratory meal) following a siyum. If the fast is not broken at a seudat mitzvah, there is a dispute among halakhic authorities regarding the duration of the fast. Normally, all Jewish fasts continue until nightfall (most authorities rule that this is somewhere between 20 and 40 minutes after sunset, but varies by location and time of year). However, the presence of a fast immediately before a holiday presents a unique quandary. Normally, one may not enter a Shabbat (Saturday, the Jewish Sabbath) or Yom Tov (festival) in a state of fasting. The Talmud (Eruvin 41a) discusses what one should do when a formal fast day (other than Yom Kippur) falls directly before Shabbat or Yom Tov. The sages of the Talmud are divided over two options: Either one should break the fast shortly before sundown, or one should fast through nightfall, regardless. Since the Talmud arrives at no clear conclusion, disagreement arose among halakhic authorities. The Maharil rules that the fast continues until nightfall, while others rule that it should be broken before sundown.

== Breaking the fast ==
In modern times, however, this fast is rarely observed, as most firstborns opt to attend a siyum (festive meal celebrating the completion of a tractate of the Talmud) instead. This is considered a legitimate form of "breaking" the fast, and therefore the firstborn may eat during the rest of the day.

The Mishnah Berurah quotes three opinions regarding circumstances in which the fast may be broken. According to the first, a healthy individual must fast if he can sustain the fast without undue suffering and without any subsequent weakening that would affect his ability or inclination to heartily partake of his Passover Seder meal (and specifically the matzah). (If one is obligated to partake of a festive meal that day, such as if he is the father of an infant on the day of circumcision, this opinion requires him to undertake a reciprocal fast at the soonest opportunity.) According to the second custom (quoted by the Magen Avraham in the name of the Maharash Levi), the fast may be broken at any festive meal celebrating a circumcision or a redemption of the firstborn. According to the third custom, based upon the Maharshal, the fast may even be broken at a seudat mitzvah for a siyum celebrating the completion of study of a tractate of Talmud. The latter custom is commonly observed.

If a firstborn attending a siyum does not hear the completion of the tractate, or if he does not understand what he hears, or if he is in the shiva period of mourning and is thus forbidden from listening to the Torah material being taught, some authorities rule that subsequent eating would not qualify as a seudat mitzvah and he would therefore be forbidden to break his fast. Other authorities allow a firstborn to break his fast under such circumstances. The Minchas Yitzchak (ibid.) suggests that a firstborn in such a position should at least try to contribute to the siyum in some way, such as by sponsoring or helping to prepare the meal.

In order to break one's fast on a seudat mitzvah, many authorities rule that one must partake of at least a kotevet of food (around 1.5 to 2 oz.) or a melo lugmav of liquid (at least around 1.7 oz.) at the seudah. Other authorities rule that a firstborn need not eat anything at the siyum itself, and that he may break his fast anytime after the siyum.

Rabbi Moshe Feinstein extends the possibility of breaking the fast to include even breaking it at a festive meal celebrating the completion of any mitzvah that required regular, continual involvement. According to these authorities, such a meal would be considered a seudat mitzvah of adequate caliber to exempt one from continuing the fast.

Additionally, the Mordechai quotes the ruling of his father-in-law Rabbeinu Yechiel that firstborns need not fast at all on the day before Passover; firstborns need only limit their diet to snacks. (The Bigdei Yesha commentary suggests the rationale behind this ruling was to avoid holding a fast during the month of Nisan, which is generally prohibited.) The Mishnah Berurah states that it is appropriate for a weak individual to follow this ruling.

Nevertheless, there are communities, including many North African communities and the Sephardic community in Amsterdam, where the firstborns do fast.

== When Passover begins after Shabbat ==
If the eve of Passover is on Shabbat, many authorities rule that the fast is not observed at all, which is common practice in Sephardic communities. Others fast on the previous Thursday, which is common practice in Ashkenazi communities. This is because it is forbidden to fast on Shabbat except when Yom Kippur falls on it, and fasts are preferably not set for Friday.

In such a scenario, the ritual of Bedikat Chametz (the formal search for forbidden leaven that is conducted before Passover) is set for Thursday night. Normally, it is forbidden to eat (starting from nightfall) before conducting the Bedikat Chametz. However, for a firstborn who is fatigued or uncomfortable from the fast, the Mateh Moshe and Yaakov Moelin rule that some food may be eaten before the search or that another person may be appointed to perform the search on behalf of the firstborn.

Moshe Feinstein (OC 4:69:4) raises the possibility, based on Isserlies that one who breaks the adjusted Thursday fast might be required to fast on Friday, as perhaps the fast is considered to have been moved to whichever earlier day is more appropriate, and not to Thursday specifically. Since many opinions dispute Isserlies, Feinstein wrote that practically speaking, one should not fast on Friday in such circumstances. This rationale may be based on Nathaniel Weil, who wrote that excessive strictures regarding keeping the Fast of the Firstborn should not come at the expense of possibly fasting unnecessarily during the month of Nisan.

The above halakhic quandary is avoided completely if a firstborn fasts the entire day on Thursday. However, Rabbi Feinstein makes no mention of this requirement. For a firstborn who eats on Thursday to comply with the ruling of Issserlies, the Piskei T'shuvot suggests participating in a second siyum on Friday, while Tzvi Pesach Frank suggests partaking on Friday of leftovers from the previous day's siyum.

== Status of the fast ==
In halakha, there are two general types of fast: the communal fast and the individual fast. Among other differences between the two, a special prayer is added by the Chazzan or prayer leader on communal fasts whenever both ten fasting individuals congregate and the Chazzan is fasting. While Avraham Gombiner treats the fast as an individual's fast, the Chaim Benveniste, Hezekiah da Silva, and Isaac ben Moses of Vienna view it as a communal fast. To avoid the practical implications of the controversy, the Mishnah Berurah suggests that a firstborn should not serve as Chazzan on the day of the fast.

Additionally, this fast differs from many other fasts established in the Jewish calendar in that this fast is not indicated in the Tanakh. This lessens the severity of the fast, and someone who experiences significant discomfort as a result of fasting may break his fast (Mishnah Berurah, based on Isserlies).

== Modern practice ==
The custom of the Fast of the Firstborn is observed nearly universally today throughout Orthodox Ashkenazi Jewish communities. However, some Sefardic and Mizrahi communities have not fully adopted the custom. It is not traditionally observed by Yemenite Jews and its practice was discouraged by Moroccan-Israeli rabbi Joseph Messas.

Amongst Conservative Jews, the custom is endorsed by various communities and cited positively in their response.

== See also ==
- Jewish holiday
- Passover
- Quartodecimanism
