= Eve of Passover on Shabbat =

Jewish holiday

In Judaism, when the Eve of Passover (Hebrew: ערב פסח, Erev Pesach) falls on Shabbat, special laws regarding the preparation for Passover are observed.

== Fast of the Firstborn ==
When the Eve of Passover falls on Shabbat, the Fast of the Firstborn customarily takes place on the preceding Thursday, instead of the day before (Friday). This is because it is forbidden to fast on Shabbat (except when it coincides with Yom Kippur), and it is preferable not to fast on Friday.

== Search for chametz ==
Normally, the search for chametz (leavened bread) occurs on the night of the 14th of Nisan, which is one night before the start of Passover. When this night is a Friday, the search for chametz takes place one night earlier (on the 13th), since use of a candle and the act of burning chametz are forbidden on Shabbat. The chametz is then burned on Friday morning.

It is normally forbidden to eat before conducting the search for chametz, which is carried out by the firstborn. This firstborn may be fatigued or uncomfortable due to having just observed the Fast of the Firstborn. According to the Mateh Moshe and Mahari"l, a firstborn who is fatigued or uncomfortable from the fast may eat some food before the search, or another person may be appointed to perform the search on behalf of the firstborn.

After completing the search, we recite the first kol chamira, a text found in any haggadah or Passover prayer book. We recite this passage to nullify any chametz that may not have been found. Chametz to be eaten on Friday and Shabbos is stored in a safe place, where it will not get mixed with the Pesach foods.

== The Shabbos meals ==
The first of the three meals is consumed on Friday evening, as usual. On Saturday morning, morning services at synagogue are held earlier than usual in most communities. Following services, a second meal is held; it is a proper practice to divide this meal into two (reciting Birkat Hamazon, pausing and starting a new meal again) because according to some opinions one fulfills Shalosh Seudot in this manner.

One should not eat the challah over the Pesach utensils and tablecloths. One should prepare the exact amount you need for the members of your household, in order to avoid being stuck with leftovers. It is best for to serve small rolls, as they leave fewer crumbs, and to eat over a tissue or napkin, which can be flushed down the toilet when done. After finishing the challah, any leftover chametz should be disposed of by crumbling them over the toilet and flushing it. When done, the second kol chamira is recited. For those who are concerned about having chametz around, there is also the option of eating kosher for Passover egg matzos or cooked matzos (which may be preferable for those with braces). Consult your rabbi to know how much of it must be consumed.

Chametz may not be eaten after the fourth halachic hour on Shabbos morning. Consult a Jewish calendar for the exact time in your area. One may not eat Passover matzos this entire day. We eat the meal early in the morning, so that the challah is finished at the proper time. For those who used egg matzos or cooked matzos, consult your rabbi if you can eat this later in the day.

Many people utilize the long Shabbos afternoon as an opportunity to familiarize themselves with the text and translation of the Haggadah in advance of the Seder. It is also a good idea to take a nap, but one may not verbally express that they are taking a nap in preparation of the Seder, as doing so would be considered preparing from the Sabbath for after the Sabbath.

== Observing Seudah Shlishit ==
Seudah Shlishit is the third meal of Shabbat, usually eaten on Shabbat afternoon. Traditionally, two loaves of bread (challah) are served with the three Shabbat meals, including Seudah Shlishit. However, when the Eve of Passover falls on Shabbat, the restriction on consuming such chametz begins on Saturday morning. As such, it is a proper practice to divide the morning meal into two (reciting Birkat Hamazon, pausing and starting a new meal again) because according to some opinions one fulfills Shalosh Seudot in this manner; however, most opinions assume that this doesn't work as Seudah Shelishit must be eaten in the afternoon, so many do not observe this practice.

In the afternoon, one should eat meat, fish or fruit sometime in the afternoon. In some communities, egg matzah or cooked matzah is eaten at this meal. It is proper to refrain from eating too much so as to maintain an appetite for the matzah at the Seder.

Preparations for the Seder, such as setting the table, washing the dishes, or making the salt water, may not be made until after Shabbos is over.

Havdalah is inserted into the Kiddush at the Seder as it appears in a Haggadah, and va'todi'enu is recited in Shemoneh Esrei of Maariv just like any other Yom Tov that falls at the conclusion of the sabbath.

== Frequency ==
While the coincidence of the Eve of Passover and Shabbat can occur as often as three times in a decade, it is also possible for as many as 20 years to pass between two instances. The likelihood of the Eve of Passover occurring on Shabbat on any given year is 11.5%. During the 20th century, the Eve of Passover fell on Shabbat 12 times: in 1903 (5663), 1910 (5670), 1923 (5683), 1927 (5687), 1930 (5690), 1947 (5707), 1950 (5710), 1954 (5714), 1974 (5734), 1977 (5737), 1981 (5741), and 1994 (5754). In the 21st century, it has occurred five times: in 2001 (5761), 2005 (5765), 2008 (5768), 2021 (5781), and 2025 (5785). Future occurrences in the 21st century include 2045 (5805), 2048 (5808), 2052 (5812), 2072 (5832), 2075 (5835), 2079 (5839), and 2099 (5859).

== Other holidays in the same year ==
For years in which the Eve of Passover falls on Shabbat, some other Jewish holidays are also observed irregularly. Purim, which comes earlier in the year, occurs on Friday (beginning Thursday night, and making Purim a three–day holiday in Jerusalem), the spring holiday of Shavuot occurs on Monday (beginning Sunday night - and outside of Israel also on Tuesday), Rosh Hashanah occurs on Tuesday and Wednesday (beginning Monday night), Sukkot and Shemini Atzeret-Simchat Torah occur on Tuesday (beginning Monday night - and outside of Israel also on Wednesday), and Yom Kippur occurs on Thursday (beginning Wednesday night).

== See also ==
- Days of week on Hebrew calendar
