= Afikoman =

Portion of matzo used during Passover

Afikoman/אפיקומן
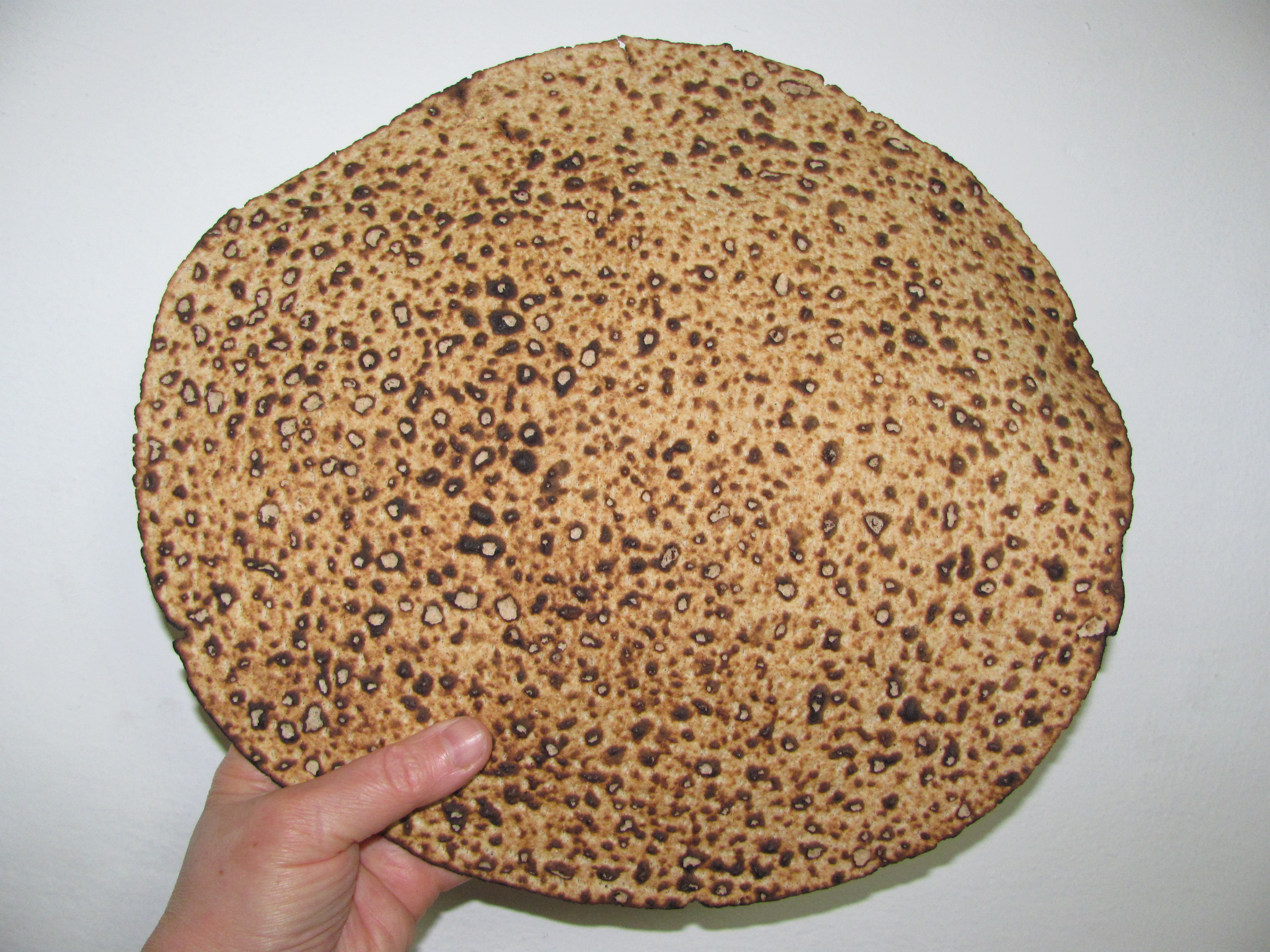
- Handmade shmura matzo used at the Passover Seder especially for the mitzvot of eating matzo and afikoman
- Type: Dessert

Afikoman or Afikomen (Mishnaic Hebrew: אֲפִיקִימוֹן ʾăpîqîmôn; Modern pronunciation: אֲפִיקוֹמָן ʾăpîqômān) based on Greek epikomon [ἐπὶ κῶμον] or epikomion [ἐπικώμιον], meaning "that which comes after" or "dessert"), a word originally having the connotation of "refreshments eaten after the meal", is now almost strictly associated with the half-piece of matzo which is broken in two during the early stages of the Passover Seder and set aside to be eaten as a dessert after the meal.

Based on the Mishnah in Pesahim 119b, the afikoman is a substitute for the Passover sacrifice, which was the last thing eaten at the Passover meal during the eras of the First and Second Temples and during the period of the Tabernacle. The Talmud states that it is forbidden to have any other food after the afikoman, so that the taste of the matzo that was eaten after the meal remains in the participants' mouths. Since the destruction of the Temple and the discontinuation of the Korban Pesach, Jews eat a piece of matzo now known as afikoman to finish the Passover Seder meal.

Customs around the afikoman vary, though they often share the common purpose of keeping children awake and alert during the Seder until the afikoman is eaten. Following Ashkenazi customs, the head of household may hide the afikoman for the children to find, or alternatively, the children may steal the afikoman and ransom it back. Chabad tradition discourages stealing the afikoman lest it lead to bad habits. Following Mizrahi customs, the afikoman may be tied in a sling to a child's back for the duration of the Seder.

== Etymology ==
Mishnaic Hebrew: אֲפִיקִימוֹן. The Greek word on which afikoman is based has two meanings, according to the Babylonian Talmud and the Jerusalem Talmud. Both Talmuds agree on the halakha (stated in the Passover Haggadah under the answer given to the Wise Son) that no other food should be eaten for the rest of the night after the afikoman is consumed. The Babylonian Talmud explains that the word "afikoman" derives from the Greek word for "dessert", the last thing eaten at a meal. The Jerusalem Talmud, however, derives the word afikoman from epikomion, meaning "after-dinner revelry" or "entertainment". It was the custom of Romans and Greeks to move from one party or banquet to another. The halakha prohibiting anything else being eaten after the afikoman therefore enjoins Jews to distinguish their Passover Seder from the pagan rituals of other nations.

== Use ==
The afikoman is prepared during the fourth part of the Seder, Yachatz. During this ritual, the leader of the Seder takes the middle piece of matzo out from the stack of three whole matzot on the Seder table. They break the matzo in two, returning the smaller piece to the stack and putting aside the larger piece to be eaten later during Tzafun ("Hidden", the twelfth part of the Seder, which immediately follows the main meal). This is the afikoman, which is wrapped in a napkin before being hidden.

=== Custom of "stealing" ===
The custom of hiding the afikoman so that the children at the Seder will "steal" it and demand a reward for it is based on the following Gemara: Rabbi Eliezer says that one should "grab the matzos" so that the children won't fall asleep.

The Haggadah Otzar Divrei HaMeforshim cites several other reasons for the custom of stealing the afikoman. According to the author of the work Mekor Chaim – Chavos Yair, this custom demonstrates love for the mitzvah of afikoman. Rabbi Menashe Klein, the Ungvar Rebbe, says that this custom is a re-enactment of the biblical account of Jacob stealing the blessings that were supposed to go to his brother Esau. Midrash Pliah says that Isaac told Esau, "Your brother came with trickery" (Genesis 27:35), adding, "and he took out the afikoman." According to the Midrash, this account took place on Passover. Therefore, the children steal the afikoman to get the blessings, which are the present that they ask their fathers to buy for them.

=== Eating the afikoman ===
After the meal and customary desserts, the leader of the Seder distributes pieces of the afikoman to each guest. If there is not enough to go around, additional pieces of matzo may be added to each person's portion of afikoman.

Jewish law prescribes that an olive-sized piece of matzo be eaten to fulfill the mitzvah of eating the afikoman. Many people eat an additional, olive-sized piece of matzo together with it. The first piece of matzo commemorates the Korban Pesach (Paschal lamb), whose meat was eaten at the very end of the festive Seder meal in the days that the Temple stood. The second piece commemorates the matzo that was eaten together with the meat of the Paschal Lamb in the days of the Temple, in fulfillment of the Torah commandment, "They shall eat [the Passover lamb] together with matzo and maror" (Exodus 12:8). Like the eating of the matzo earlier in the Seder, the afikoman is eaten while reclining to the left (in some Orthodox Jewish circles, women and girls do not lean).

According to Jewish law, the afikoman must be consumed before midnight, just as the Korban Pesach was eaten before midnight during the days of the Temple in Jerusalem. Thus, if the Seder is running late with much singing and discussion of the themes of the Exodus from Egypt, families may have to shorten the meal segment of the Seder and proceed quickly to the afikoman.

After the eating of the afikoman, no other food may be eaten for the rest of the night, other than the last two cups of wine at the Seder and coffee, tea, or water.

== Sources ==
- Kaplan, Aryeh (1978). The MeAm Lo'ez Haggadah. Brooklyn, NY: Maznaim Publishing Corporation.
