= Hagalah =

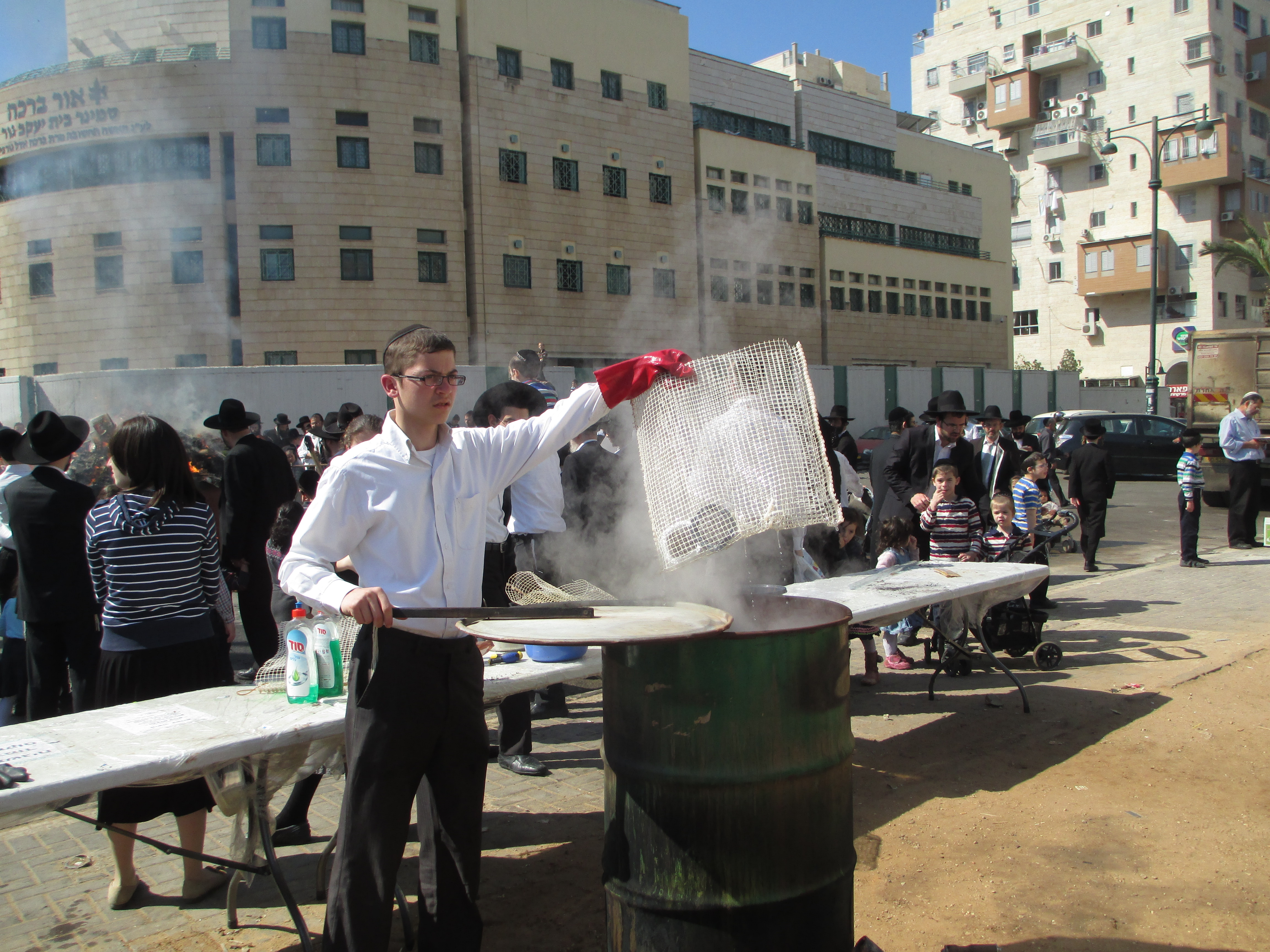
Boiling utensils on the eve of Passover in Bnei Brak.

In Jewish law, Hagalah is a procedure performed in order to make fit for use cookware, bakeware, and utensils that were previously used with non-kosher foods in a way that caused the absorption of non-kosher flavors into the walls of the utensil.

Hagalah is also done in order to use utensils for dairy cooking after meat was cooked in them, and vice versa, or for using utensils during the Passover holiday after they were previously used with chametz (leavened products). Generally, the kashering is done in the same way that the non-kosher substance was absorbed into the walls of the utensil ("just as it absorbed, so it expels").

== Source in the Torah ==
This concept is derived from a verse in Parshat Matot that states:

Only the gold, the silver, the copper, the iron, the tin, and the lead; whatever is used in fire you shall pass through fire and then it will be clean; it must, however, [also] be cleansed with sprinkling water, and whatever is not used in fire you shall pass through water.

— Numbers 31:22–23

== Kasherable materials ==
Utensils made from any type of metal, stone, wood, bone, leather, or natural rubber may be kashered by hagalah. Earthenware, china, porcelain, glassware, and paper utensils cannot be kashered by hagalah. Any utensil which may get ruined during the hagalah process may not be kashered, out of concern that its owner would not want to properly kosher the utensil in order to avoid damaging it.

== Process ==
Before immersion in the boiling water, the object must be cleaned thoroughly and left unused for a period of 24 hours. All surfaces of the item are then placed into a pot of water that is on the heat source and at a rolling boil.

== See also ==
- Tevilat Keilim
- Chametz
- Milk and meat in Jewish law
