= Passover =

Jewish holiday

Passover חַג הַפֶּסַח
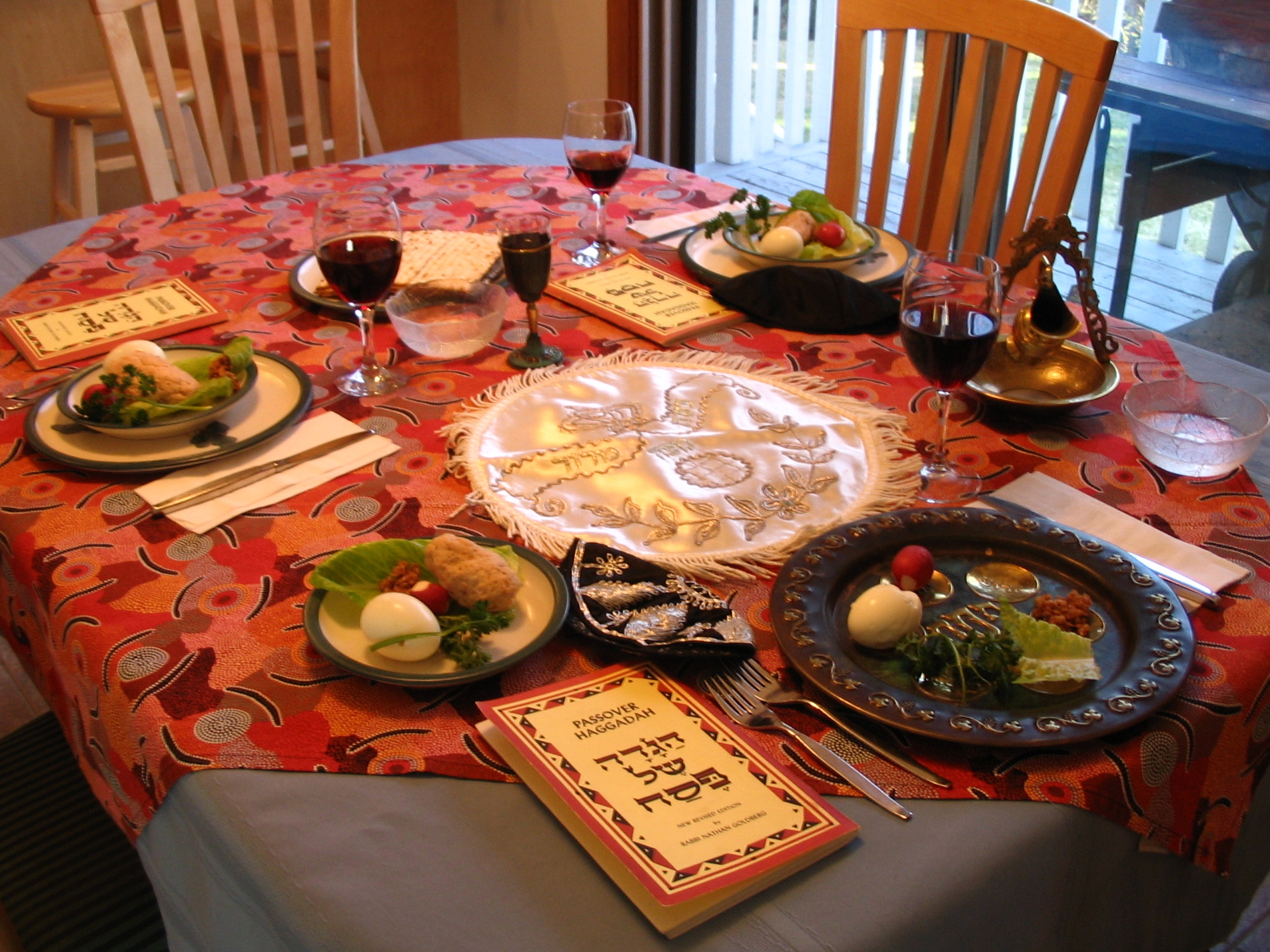
- A table set up for a Passover Seder
- Official name: Pesach – Hebrew: פסח, romanized: Pesaḥ
- Type: Jewish (religious and cultural)
- Significance: Celebrates the Exodus, the freedom from slavery of the Israelites from Ancient Egypt that followed the Ten Plagues; Beginning of the 49 days of Counting of the Omer; Connected to barley harvest in spring
- Celebrations: Passover Seder
- Begins: 15 Nisan
- Ends: 21 Nisan (22 Nisan in traditional Diaspora communities)
- Date: 15 Nisan, 16 Nisan, 17 Nisan, 18 Nisan, 19 Nisan, 20 Nisan, 21 Nisan, 22 Nisan
- 2025 date: Sunset, 12 April – nightfall, 20 April (8 days)
- 2026 date: Sunset, 1 April – nightfall, 9 April (8 days)
- 2027 date: Sunset, 21 April – nightfall, 29 April (8 days)
- 2028 date: Sunset, 10 April – nightfall, 18 April (8 days)
- Related to: Shavuot ("Festival of Weeks"), which follows 49 days from the second night of Passover.

Passover, also called Pasch (/pæsk/) or Pesach (/ˈpɛsɑːx, ˈpeɪ-/; Biblical Hebrew: חַג הַפֶּסַח, romanized: Ḥag Ha‑Pesaḥ, lit. 'Pilgrimage of the Passing Over'), or Peysekh in Yiddish, is a major Jewish holiday and one of the Three Pilgrimage Festivals. It celebrates the Exodus of the Israelites from slavery in Egypt.

According to the traditional story of Exodus (Shemot, or Names), the second book of the Torah, the Israelites, resident in Egypt (Mizrayim) since the time of Joseph, are enslaved by the Pharaoh. Moses, an Israelite child adopted by the Egyptians who rose to prominence, leads the Israelite community to demand from Pharaoh that he let them go. When Pharaoh refuses, God sends ten plagues upon Egypt. God commanded Moses to tell the Israelites to sacrifice a lamb and mark their doorframes with its blood. God would then bring about the tenth plague, in which God would smite all the firstborn in Egypt. God would pass over Israelite homes marked by blood, so that the plague should not enter, hence the name. After the tenth plague, Pharaoh permits the Israelites to leave, and Moses parts the red sea to escape Egypt into the Sinai. Many scholars believe Passover originated as a pre-Israelite feast ritual.

This story is recounted at the Passover Seder by reading the Magid section of the Haggadah. The Haggadah is a standardized ritual book for the Passover Seder, containing an account of the Exodus story, in fulfillment of the command "And thou shalt tell (וְהִגַּדְתָּ֣, higgad'ta) thy son in that day, saying: It is because of that which the LORD did for me when I came forth out of Egypt." Jews are forbidden from possessing or eating leavened foods (chametz) during the holiday.

Pesach starts on the 15th day of the Hebrew month of Nisan, which is considered the first month of the Hebrew year. The Jewish calendar is adjusted to align with the solar calendar so that 15 Nisan always falls on Sunday, Tuesday, Thursday, or Saturday. The Hebrew day starts and ends at sunset, so the holiday starts at sunset the day before. For example, in 2027, 15 Nisan will coincide with Thursday, April 22. Therefore, Pesach will start at sundown on Wednesday, April 21, 2027.

== Etymology ==
Biblical Hebrew: פֶּסַח is rendered as Tiberian [pɛsaħ], and Modern Hebrew: [ˈpesaχ] Pesaḥ, Pesakh. The verb pāsaḥ (פָּסַח) is first mentioned in the Torah's account of the Exodus, and there is some debate about its exact meaning. The commonly held assumption that it means "He passed over" (פסח), in reference to God "passing over" (or "skipping") the houses of the Hebrews during the final of the Ten Plagues of Egypt, stems from the translation provided in the Septuagint (Ancient Greek: παρελεύσεται, romanized: pareleusetai in Exodus 12:23, and ἐσκέπασεν, eskepasen in Exodus 12:27.) The Targum Onkelos, written in Jewish Babylonian Aramaic, translates pesach as Hebrew: וְיֵחוֹס, romanized: wəyēḥos, lit. 'he had pity', coming from the Hebrew root חסה, meaning "to have pity". Cognate languages yield similar terms with distinct meanings, such as "make soft, soothe, placate" (Akkadian passahu), "harvest, commemoration, blow" (Egyptian), or "separate" (Arabic fsh).

Pesach may also refer to the lamb or goat which was designated as the Passover sacrifice. Four days before the Exodus, the Hebrews were commanded to set aside a lamb, and inspect it daily for blemishes. During the day on 14th Nisan, they were to slaughter the animal and use its blood to mark their lintels and door posts. Before midnight on 15th Nisan, they were to consume the lamb.

The English term Passover is first known to be recorded in the English language in William Tyndale's translation of the Bible, later appearing in the King James Version as well. It is a literal translation of the Hebrew term. In the King James Version, Exodus 12:23 reads:

For the LORD will pass through to smite the Egyptians; and when he seeth the blood upon the lintel, and on the two side posts, the LORD will pass over the door, and will not suffer the destroyer to come in unto your houses to smite you.

== Origins and theories ==
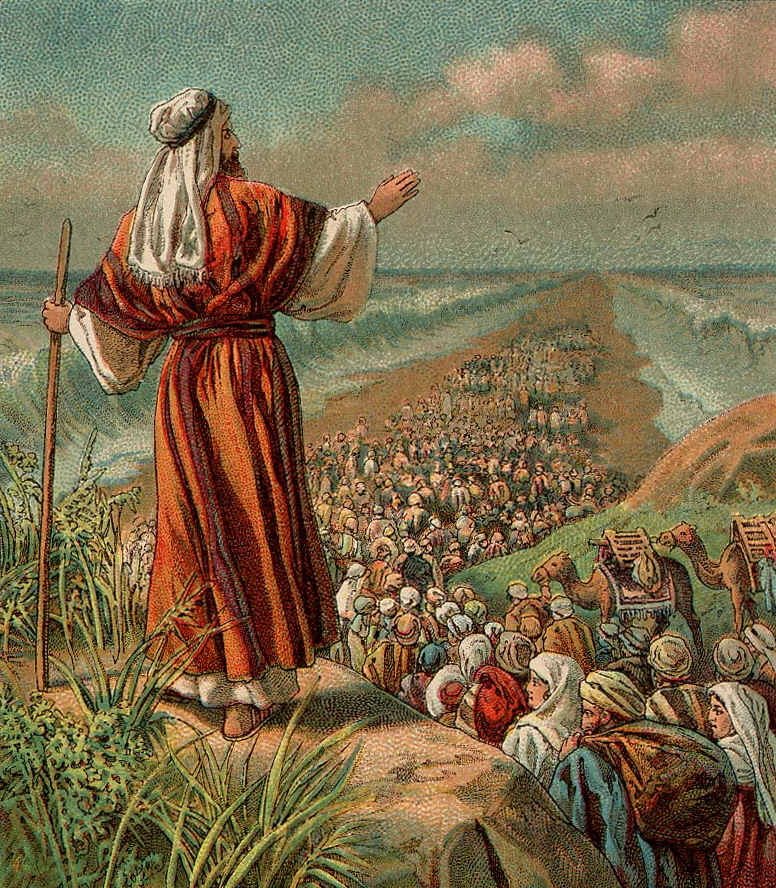
Illustration of the Exodus from Egypt, 1907

Passover is believed to have formed in the merger of a pastoral apotropaic ritual and an agricultural harvest festival, both practiced in the Land of Israel.

Many modern scholars believe the Passover ritual had Canaanite or pre-Israelite semi-nomadic origins, as possibly two separate festivals, that were either combined or separated, adopted later by the Israelites. Bernard M. Levinson proposes that it may have originated as a protective or apotropaic rite of sacrifice that took place within a clan, later becoming centralized as part of Deuteronomic reforms and becoming combined with the Feast of Unleavened Bread.

A further hypothesis maintains that once the Priestly Code was promulgated, the Exodus narrative took on a central function, as the apotropaic rite was, arguably, amalgamated with the Canaanite agricultural festival of spring, which was a ceremony of unleavened bread, connected with the barley harvest. As the Exodus motif grew, the original function and symbolism of these double origins were lost, resulting in the biblical Passover. Several motifs replicate the features associated with the Akitu spring festival of ancient Mesopotamian religion, which celebrates the sowing of barley. Scholars John Van Seters, Judah Segal, and Tamara Prošić disagree with the merged two-festivals hypothesis.

== Themes and symbolism ==
Passover commemorates the Jewish liberation from slavery as traditionally told with stories, music, and a ritual meal. It is also a spring festival and a pilgrimage festival. Passover celebrates themes of freedom and the deliverance of Jewish ancestors. The Haggadah, while it contains songs, prayers, rituals, and symbolic stories to celebrate these themes, has also been adapted and reinterpreted creatively for a modern Jewish audience. These themes have been adapted to modern issues such as the Soviet Jewry movement or Freedom Seder to protest civil rights.

Passover is accompanied by songs and games. Children have an important role in the Passover tradition such as finding the Afikoman, the hidden matzo. The Seder was such a large part of traditional Jewish life in Eastern Europe that it was often celebrated even by atheists and secularists. The role of Elijah, who is symbolically invited to the seder with an empty chair and glass of wine, recalls the blood libel. Because of its timing around Good Friday and Easter, it often historically coincided with pogroms.

== Biblical narrative ==
=== In the Book of Exodus ===
In the Book of Exodus, the Israelites are enslaved in ancient Egypt. Yahweh, God of the Israelites, appears to Moses in a burning bush and commands Moses to confront the Pharaoh. To show his power, Yahweh inflicts a series of ten plagues on the Egyptians, culminating in the plague of the death of the firstborn.

Moses said, "Thus says יהוה: Toward midnight I will go forth among the Egyptians, and every [male] first-born in the land of Egypt shall die, from the first-born of Pharaoh who sits on his throne to the first-born of the slave girl who is behind the millstones; and all the first-born of the cattle. And there shall be a loud cry in all the land of Egypt, such as has never been or will ever be again;"

— Exodus 11:4–6

Before this final plague, God commands Moses to tell the Israelites to mark a lamb's blood above their doors so God will pass over them and the plague of the death of the firstborn will not afflict them.

The biblical regulations for the observance of the festival require that all leavening be disposed of before the beginning of the 15th of Nisan according to Exodus 13:7 An unblemished lamb or goat, known as the Passover sacrifice or "Paschal Lamb", is to be set apart on 10th Nisan, and slaughtered at dusk as 14th Nisan ends in preparation for the 15th of Nisan when it will be eaten after being roasted. The literal meaning of the Hebrew is "between the two evenings". It is then to be eaten "that night", 15th Nisan, roasted, without the removal of its internal organs with unleavened bread, known as matzah, and bitter herbs known as maror. Any parts of the sacrifice that remain when the sun rises by the morning of the 15th of Nisan cannot be eaten, and must be burned instead.

The biblical regulations of the original Passover at the time of the Exodus only also include how the meal was to be eaten: "your loins girded, your sandals on your feet, and your staff in your hand; and you shall eat it hurriedly: it is a passover offering to יהוה."

The biblical requirements of slaying the Paschal lamb in the individual homes of the Hebrews and smearing the blood of the lamb on their doorways were celebrated in Egypt. However, once Israel was in the wilderness and the Tabernacle was in operation, a change was made in those two original requirements. Passover lambs were to be sacrificed at the door of the Tabernacle and no longer in the homes of the Jews. No longer, therefore, could blood be smeared on doorways.

=== The Passover in other biblical passages ===
Called the "festival [of] the unleavened bread" (Biblical Hebrew: חג המצות, romanized: ḥaḡ ham-maṣoṯ) in the Hebrew Bible, the commandment to keep Passover is recorded in the Book of Leviticus:

In the first month, on the fourteenth day of the month at dusk is the LORD's Passover. And on the fifteenth day of the same month is the feast of unleavened bread unto the LORD; seven days ye shall eat unleavened bread. In the first day ye shall have a holy convocation; ye shall do no manner of servile work. And ye shall bring an offering made by fire unto the LORD seven days; in the seventh day is a holy convocation; ye shall do no manner of servile work.

— Leviticus 23:5–8 (JPS 1917 Version)

The sacrifices may be performed only in a specific place prescribed by God. For Judaism, this is Jerusalem.

The biblical commandments concerning the Passover (and the Feast of Unleavened Bread) stress the importance of remembering:

- Exodus 12:14 commands about God's sparing of the firstborn from the tenth plague: "And this day shall be unto you for a memorial, and ye shall keep it a feast to the LORD; throughout your generations ye shall keep it a feast by an ordinance for ever."
- Exodus 13:3 repeats the command to remember: "Remember this day, in which you came out of Egypt, out of the house of bondage, for by strength the hand of the LORD brought you out from this place."
- Deuteronomy 16:12: "And thou shalt remember that thou wast a bondman in Egypt; and thou shalt observe and do these statutes".

In 2 Kings 23:21–23 and 2 Chronicles 35:1–19, King Josiah of Judah restores the celebration of the Passover, to a standard not seen since the days of the judges or the days of the prophet Samuel.

Ezra 6:19–21 records the celebration of the passover by the Jews who had returned from exile in Babylon, after the temple had been rebuilt.

=== In extra-biblical sources ===
Some of these details can be corroborated, and to some extent amplified, in extrabiblical sources. The removal (or "sealing up") of the leaven is referred to in the Elephantine papyri and ostraca in an Imperial Aramaic papyrus letter from the 5th century BCE from Elephantine, Egypt. The slaughter of the lambs on the 14th is mentioned in Jubilees, a Jewish work of the Ptolemaic period, and by the Herodian-era writers Josephus and Philo. These sources also indicate that "between the two evenings" was taken to mean the afternoon. Jubilees states the sacrifice was eaten that night, and together with Josephus states that nothing of the sacrifice was allowed to remain until morning. Philo states that the banquet included hymns and prayers.

== Date and duration ==
The Passover begins on the 15th day of the month of Nisan, which at present falls between March 26 and April 25 of the Gregorian calendar. The 15th day begins in the evening, after the 14th day, and the seder meal is eaten that evening. Passover is a spring festival, so the 15th day of Nisan typically begins on the night of a full moon after the northern vernal equinox. However, due to leap months falling after the vernal equinox, Passover sometimes starts on the second full moon after vernal equinox, as in 2016.

To ensure that Passover did not start before spring, the tradition in ancient Israel held that the lunar new year, the first day of Nisan, would not start until the barley was ripe, being the test for the onset of spring. If the barley was not ripe, or various other phenomena indicated that spring was not yet imminent, an intercalary month (Adar II) would be added. However, since at least the 4th century, the intercalation has been fixed mathematically according to the Metonic cycle.

In Israel, Passover is the seven-day holiday of the Feast of Unleavened Bread, with the first and last days celebrated as legal holidays and as holy days involving holiday meals, special prayer services, and abstention from work; the intervening days are known as Chol HaMoed ("Weekdays [of] the Festival"). Jews outside of Israel celebrate the festival for eight days. Reform and Reconstructionist Jews usually celebrate the holiday over seven days.

Karaites use a different calendar; they rely on visual identification of ripe barley and the date of Passover cannot be determined before this. Some modern Karaites follow the Rabbinical calendar in modern Israel because of social pressure.

The Samaritans use a calendrical system that uses a different method from that current in Rabbinic practice; it sometimes is the same date on the solar calendar, sometimes two days later, and sometimes an entire month later. In 2024, Rabbinical Passover begins at sunset on 22 April. On the calendar used by the Samaritans, 22 April 2024 is also the day of the Passover sacrifice. Karaite and Samaritan Passovers are each one day long followed by the six-day Festival of Unleavened Bread, for a total of seven days.

== Prohibition of chametz ==
=== Removing all leaven (chametz) ===
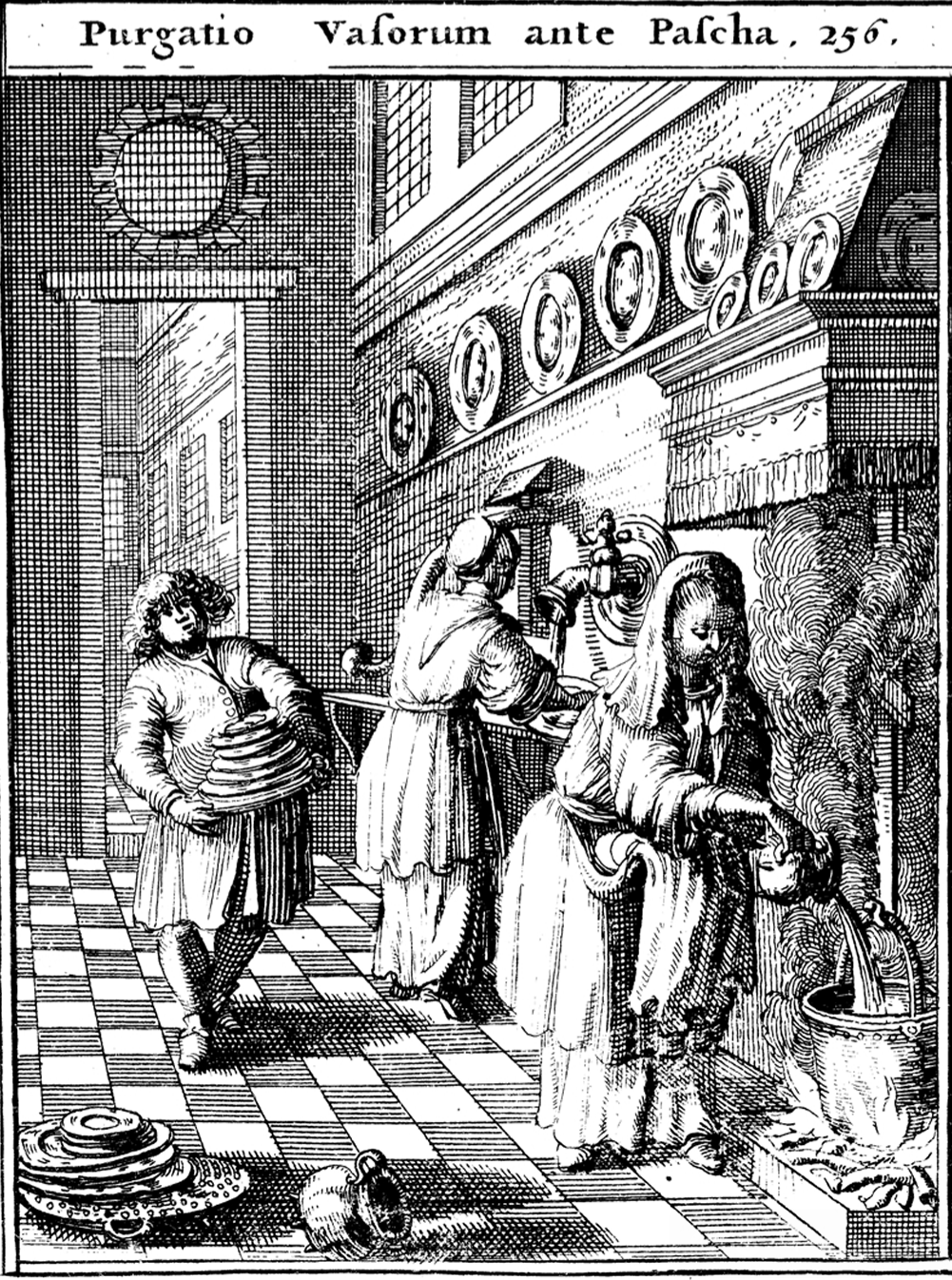
Washing dishes for passover (1657)

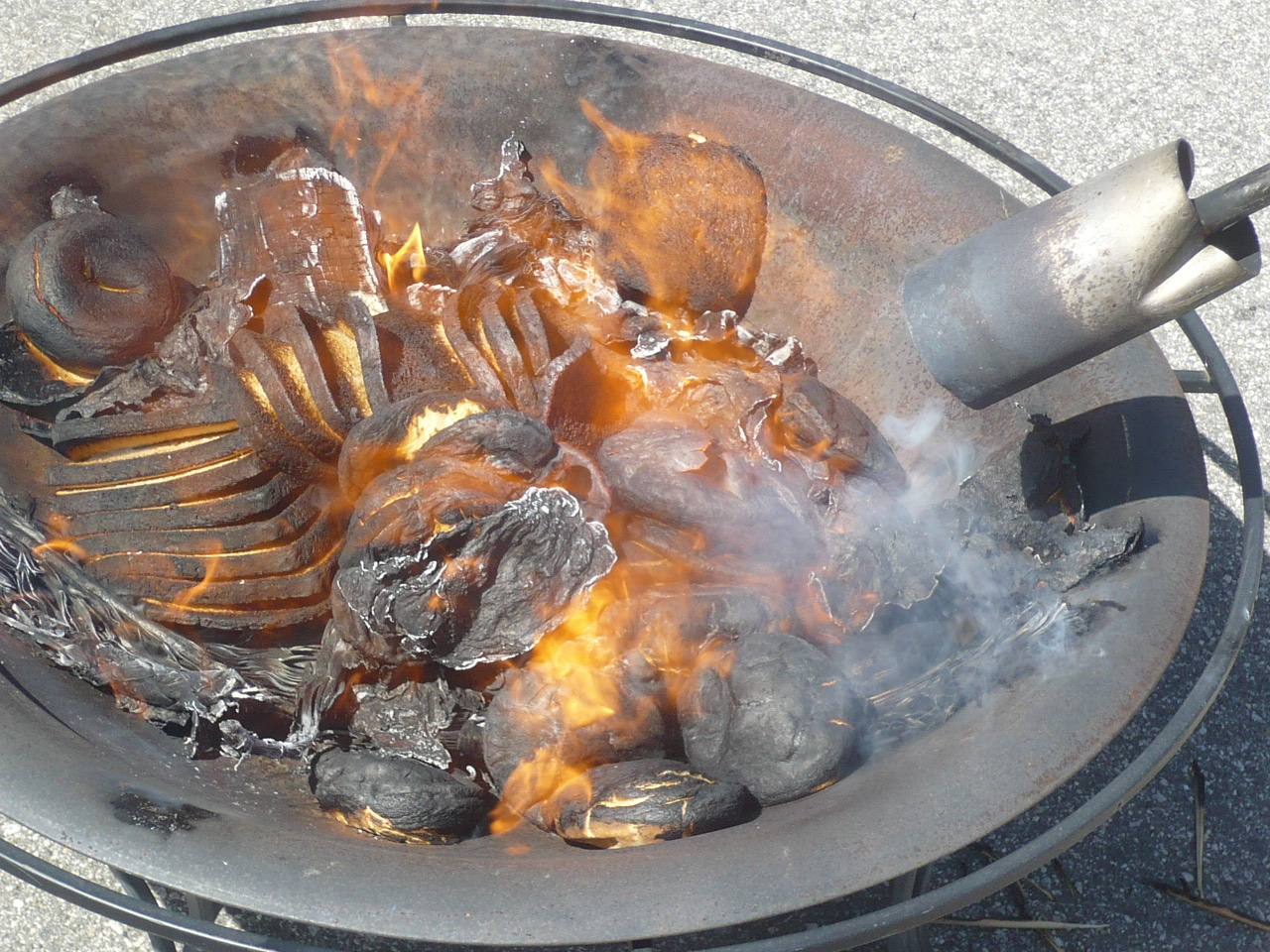
Burning chametz on the morning before Passover begins

Leaven, in Hebrew chametz (Hebrew: חמץ ḥamets, "leavening") is made from one of five types of grains combined with water and left to stand for more than eighteen minutes. The consumption, keeping, and owning of chametz is forbidden during Passover. Yeast and fermentation are not themselves forbidden as seen for example by wine, which is required, rather than merely permitted. According to Halakha, the ownership of such chametz is also proscribed.

Chametz does not include baking soda, baking powder or like products. Although these are defined in English as leavening agents, they leaven by chemical reaction, not by biological fermentation. Thus, bagels, waffles and pancakes made with baking soda and matzah meal are considered permissible, while bagels made with sourdough and pancakes and waffles made with yeast are prohibited.

The Torah commandments regarding chametz are:

- To remove all chametz from one's home, including things made with chametz, before the first day of Passover It may be simply used up, thrown out (historically, destroyed by burning), or given or sold to non-Jews.
- To refrain from eating chametz or mixtures containing chametz during Passover.
- Not to possess chametz in one's domain (i.e. home, office, car, etc.) during Passover.

Observant Jews spend the weeks before Passover in the process of thorough housecleaning, to remove all chametz from every part of the home. Jewish law requires the elimination of olive-sized or larger quantities of leavening from one's possession, but most housekeeping goes beyond this. Even the seams of kitchen counters are thoroughly cleaned to remove traces of flour and yeast, however small. Any containers or implements that have touched chametz are stored and not used during Passover.

Some hotels, resorts, and even cruise ships across the United States, Europe, and Israel also undergo a thorough housecleaning to make their premises "kosher for Pesach" to cater to observant Jews.

==== Interpretations for abstinence from leaven or yeast ====
Some scholars suggest that the command to abstain from leavened food or yeast suggests that sacrifices offered to God involve the offering of objects in "their least altered state", that would be nearest to the way in which they were initially made by God. According to other scholars the absence of leaven or yeast means that leaven or yeast symbolizes corruption and spoiling.

There are also variations with restrictions on eating matzah before Passover so that there will be an increased appetite for it during Passover itself. Primarily among Chabad Chassidim, there is a custom of not eating matzah (flat unleavened bread) in the 30 days before Passover begins. Others have a custom to refrain from eating matzah from Rosh Chodesh Nissan, while the halacha merely restricts one from eating matzah on the day before Passover.

==== Kitniyot ====
Kitniyot (Hebrew: קִטְנִיּוֹת, qitniyyot; literally "small things") refers to legumes, rice, maize, and other foods that are similar to grains. Ashkenazi Jews historically refrain from eating kitniyot on Passover, despite there not being a clear commandment to include them in the category of chametz. Since the 19th century, the Reform movement has permitted eating kitniyot, and in 2015 the Conservative movement followed suit. Sephardi Jews have always permitted eating kitniyot on Passover.

==== Gebrochts ====
Gebrochts (Yiddish: געבראקטס, lit. 'broken', also known as Hebrew: מצה שרויה, romanized: matzah shruya, lit. 'soaked matzah') refers to matzah that has absorbed liquid. Some Hasidic Jews avoid gebrochts as well, to avoid the possibility that a clump of flour that was never properly mixed with water (and thus is still susceptible to leavening) may come into contact with the liquid.

=== Sale of leaven ===
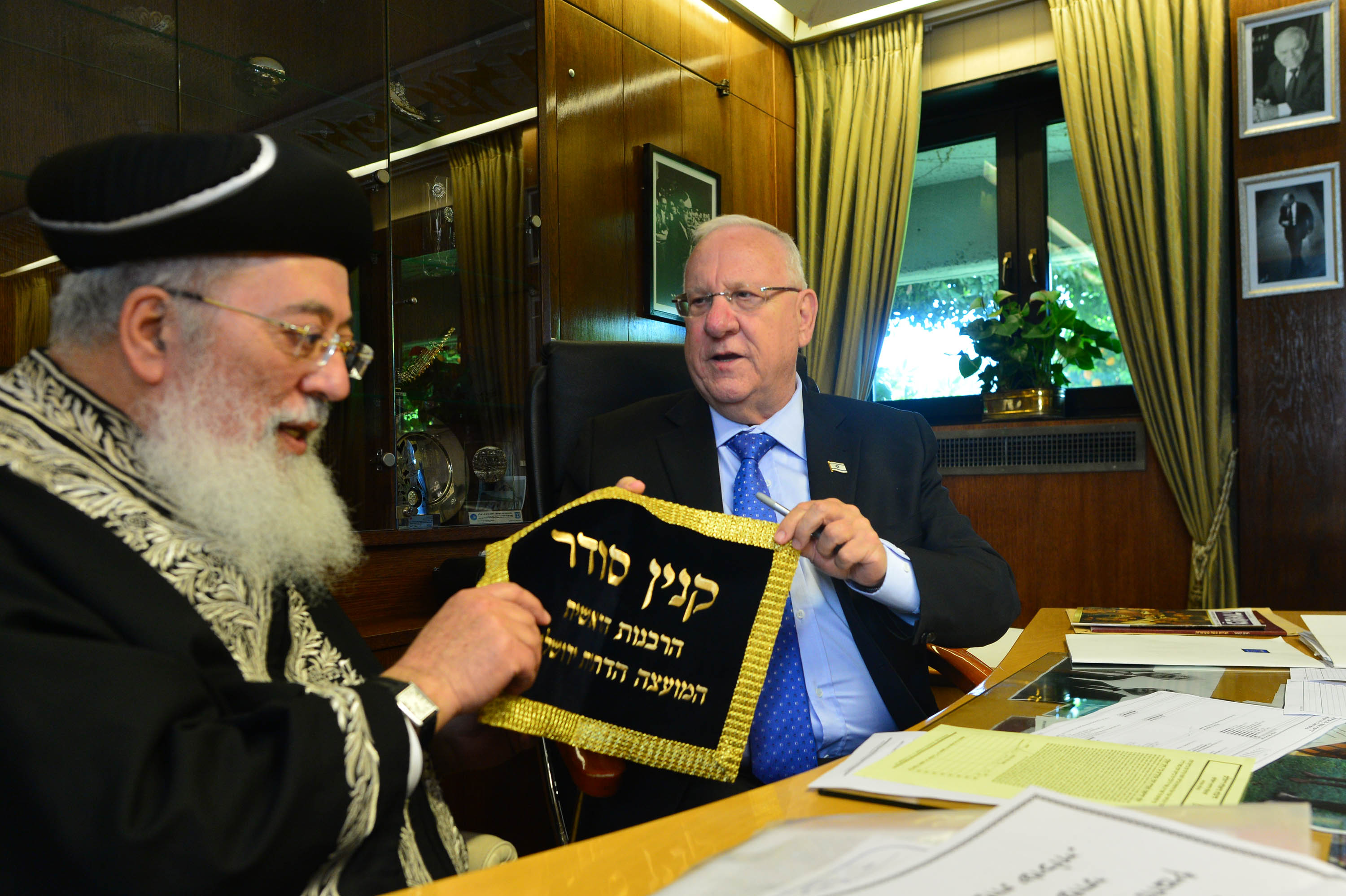
The former President of Israel Reuven Rivlin sells the leaven of the Beit HaNassi (the official residence of the president), to Shlomo Amar, the Sephardic Chief Rabbi of Israel and the Rishon LeZion, in order that Amar will later sell it to a non-Jew.

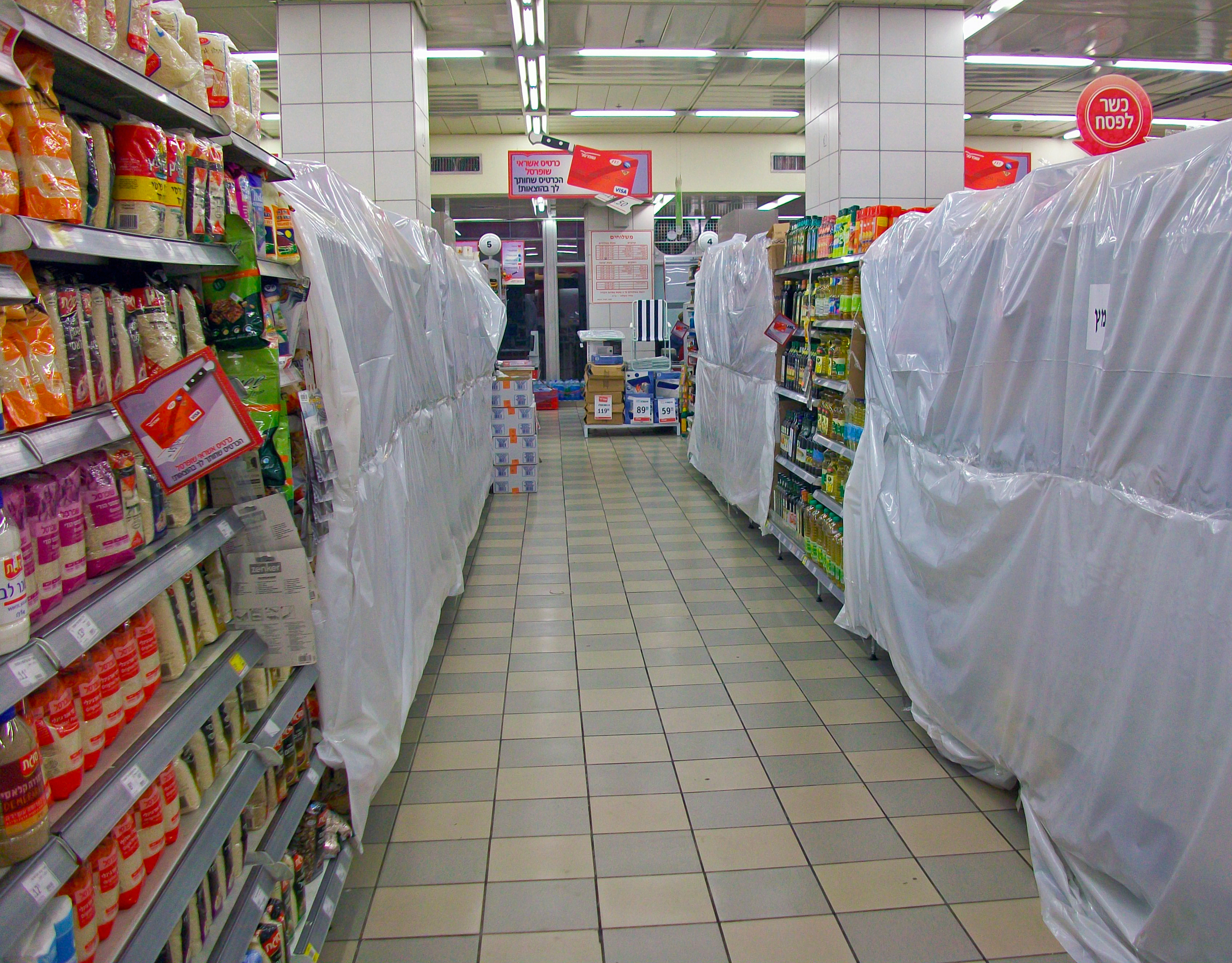
Chametz foods blocked from purchase during Passover in a Jerusalem supermarket

Leaven or chametz may be sold rather than discarded, especially in the case of relatively valuable forms such as liquor distilled from wheat, with the products being repurchased afterward. In some cases, they may never leave the house, instead being formally sold while remaining in the original owner's possession in a locked cabinet until they can be repurchased after the holiday. Modern observance may also include sealing cabinets and drawers which contain "Chametz" shut by using adhesive tape, which serves a similar purpose to a lock but also shows evidence of tampering. Although the practice of selling "Chametz" dates back many years, some Reform rabbinical authorities have come to regard it with disdain – since the supposed "new owner" never takes actual possession of the goods.

The sale of chametz may also be conducted communally via a rabbi, who becomes the "agent" for all the community's Jews through a halakhic procedure called a kinyan (acquisition). Each householder must put aside all the chametz he is selling into a box or cupboard, and the rabbi enters into a contract to sell all the chametz to a non-Jew (who is not obligated to celebrate the commandments) in exchange for a small down payment (e.g. $1.00), with the remainder due after Passover. This sale is considered completely binding according to Halakha, and at any time during the holiday, the buyer may come to take or partake of his property. The rabbi then re-purchases the goods for less than they were sold at the end of the holiday.

=== Separate kosher for Passover utensils and dishes ===
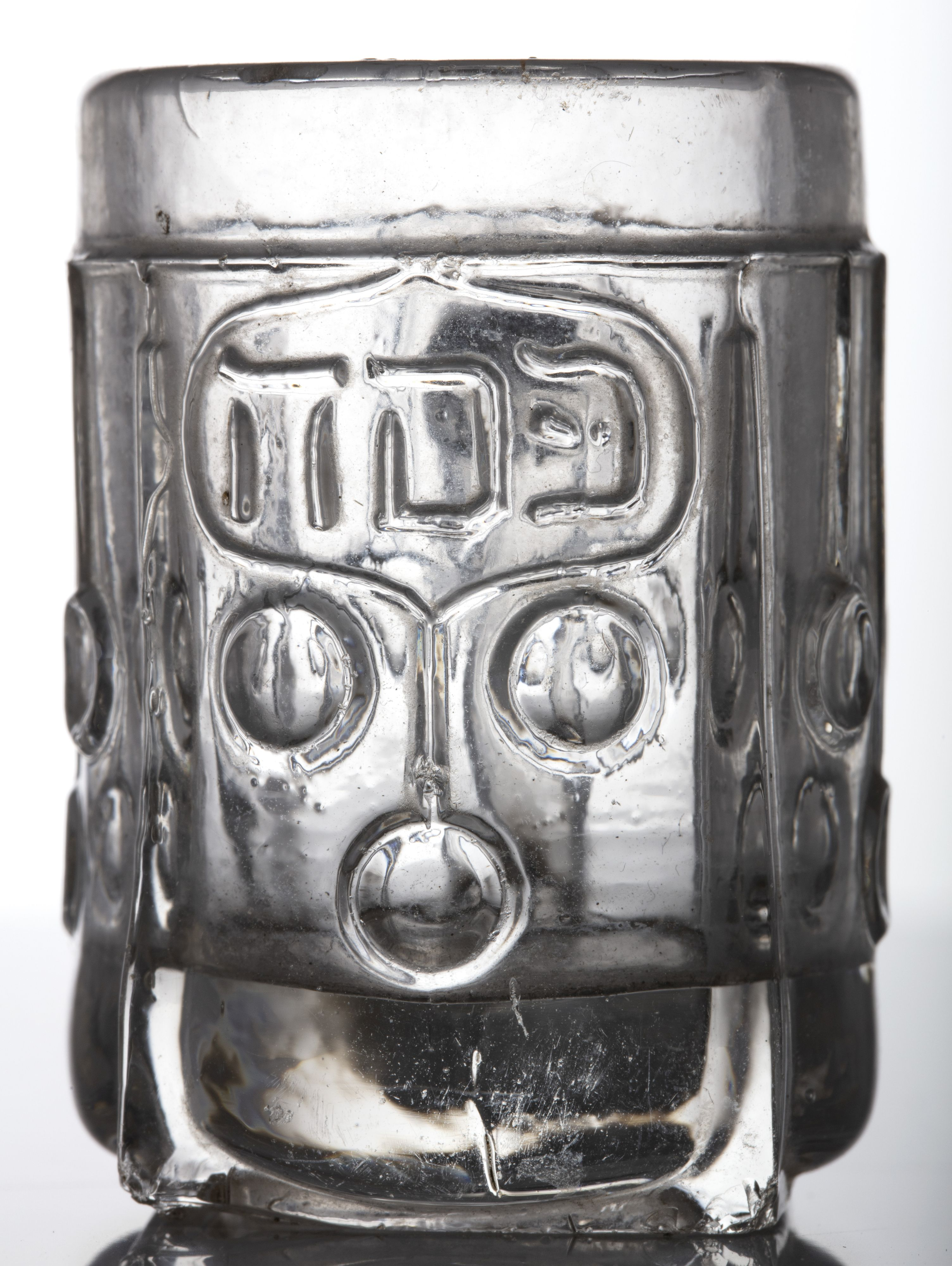
Passover glass, interwar period Poland

Due to the Torah injunction not to eat chametz (leaven) during Passover, observant families typically own complete sets of serving dishes, glassware and silverware (and in some cases, even separate dishwashers and sinks) which have never come into contact with chametz, for use only during Passover. Under certain circumstances, some chametz utensils can be immersed in boiling water (hagalat keilim) to purge them of any traces of chametz that may have accumulated during the year. Many Sephardic families thoroughly wash their year-round glassware and then use it for Passover, as the Sephardic position is that glass does not absorb enough traces of food to present a problem. Similarly, ovens may be used for Passover either by setting the self-cleaning function to the highest degree for a certain period, or by applying a blow torch to the interior until the oven glows red hot (a process called libun gamur).

=== Search for leaven ===
On the night of the fourteenth of Nisan, the night before the Passover Seder (after nightfall on the evening before Passover eve), Jews do a formal search in their homes known as bedikat chametz for any possible remaining leaven (chametz). The Talmudic sages instructed that a search for chametz be made in every home, place of work, or any place where chametz may have been brought during the year. When the first Seder is on a Saturday night, the search is conducted on the preceding Thursday night (thirteenth of Nisan) as chametz cannot be burned during Shabbat.

The Talmud in Pesahim (p. 2a) derives from the Torah that the search for chametz be conducted by the light of a candle and therefore is done at night, and although the final destruction of the chametz (usually by burning it in a small bonfire) is done on the next morning, the blessing is made at night because the search is both in preparation for and part of the commandments to remove and destroy all chametz from one's possession.

==== Blessing for search and nullification of hametz ====
Before the search is begun there is a special blessing. If several people or family members assist in the search then only one person, usually the head of that family recites the blessing having in mind to include everyone present:

Hebrew: ברוך אתה י-הוה א-להינו מלך העולם אשר קדשנו במצותיו וצונו על בעור חמץ, romanized: bāruḵ ʾattā ʾaḏonāy ʾElohēnu meleḵ hāʿolām ʾăšer qiddəšānu bəmiṣvāṯāv vəṣivānu ʿal bəʿor ḥāmeṣ

Blessed are You, Hashem our God, King of the universe, Who has sanctified us with his commandments and has commanded us concerning the removal of chametz.

— Gold, Zlotowitz, and Scherman

The search is then usually conducted by the head of the household joined by his family including children under the supervision of their parents.

It is customary to turn off the lights and conduct the search by candlelight, using a feather and a wooden spoon: candlelight effectively illuminates corners without casting shadows; the feather can dust crumbs out of their hiding places; and the wooden spoon which collects the crumbs can be burned the next day with the hametz. However, most contemporary Orthodox authorities permit using a flashlight, while some strongly encourage it due to the danger coupled with using a candle.

Because the house is assumed to have been thoroughly cleaned by the night before Passover, there is some concern that making a blessing over the search for hametz will be in vain (bracha l'vatala) if nothing is found. Thus, 10 morsels of bread or cereal smaller than the size of an olive are traditionally hidden throughout the house to ensure that some 'hametz will be found.

Upon conclusion of the search, with all the small pieces safely wrapped up and put in one bag or place, to be burned the next morning, the following is said:

Any chametz or leaven that is in my possession which I have not seen and have not removed and do not know about should be annulled and become ownerless like the dust of the earth.

== Morning of 14th of Nisan ==
Note that if the 14th of Nisan is Shabbat, many of the below will be celebrated on the 13th instead due to restrictions in place during Shabbat.

=== Fast of the Firstborn ===
On the day preceding the first Passover seder (or on Thursday morning preceding the seder, when the first seder falls on Motza'ei Shabbat), firstborn sons are commanded to celebrate the Fast of the Firstborn which commemorates the salvation of the Hebrew firstborns. According to Exodus 12:29, God struck down all Egyptian firstborns while the Israelites were not affected. However, it is customary for synagogues to conduct a siyum (ceremony marking the completion of a section of Torah learning) right after morning prayers, and the celebratory meal that follows cancels the firstborn's obligation to fast.

=== Burning and nullification of leaven ===
On the morning of the 14th of Nisan, any leavened products that remain in the householder's possession, along with the 10 morsels of bread from the previous night's search, are burned (s'rayfat chametz). The head of the household repeats the declaration of biyur chametz, declaring any chametz that may not have been found to be null and void "as the dust of the earth":

Any chametz or leaven that is in my possession which I have not seen and have not removed and do not know about should be annulled and become ownerless like the dust of the earth.

The original declaration, as recited in Aramaic, is:

כָּל חֲמִירָא וַחֲמִיעָא דְּאִיכָא בִּרְשׁוּתִי דְּלָא חֲמִיתֵהּ וּדְלָא בִעַרְתֵּהּ וּדְלָא יְדַעְנָא לֵהּ לְבַטֵּל וְלֶהֱוֵי הֶפְקֵר כְּעַפְרָא דְאַרְעָא

Should more chametz actually be found in the house during the Passover holiday, it must be burnt as soon as possible.

Unlike chametz, which can be eaten any day of the year except during Passover, kosher for Passover foods can be eaten year-round. They need not be burnt or otherwise discarded after the holiday ends.

The historic Passover sacrifice has not been brought following the Romans' destruction of the Second Temple approximately two thousand years ago, and it is therefore still not part of the modern Jewish holiday.

In the times when the Jewish Temples stood, the lamb was slaughtered and cooked on the evening of Passover and was completely consumed before the morning as described in Exodus 12:3–11.

=== Not eating matzah from sunrise until sunset (day before Passover) ===
Even matzot that are kosher for Passover cannot be eaten all day on during the daylight hours before Passover eve. Some even practice this up to 30 days before.

== Passover sacrifice ==
The main entity in Passover according to Judaism is the sacrificial lamb. During the existence of the Tabernacle and later the Temple in Jerusalem, the focus of the Passover festival was the Passover sacrifice, also known as the Paschal lamb, eaten during the Passover Seder on the 15th of Nisan. Every family large enough to completely consume a young lamb or wild goat was required to offer one for sacrifice at the Jewish Temple on the afternoon of the 14th day of Nisan, and eat it that night, which was the 15th of Nisan. If the family was too small to finish eating the entire offering in one sitting, an offering was made for a group of families. The sacrifice could not be offered with anything leavened, and had to be roasted, without its head, feet, or inner organs being removed and eaten together with unleavened bread and bitter herbs (maror). One had to be careful not to break any bones from the offering, and none of the meat could be left over by morning.

Because of the Passover sacrifice's status as a sacred offering, the only people allowed to eat it were those who had the obligation to bring the offering. Among those who could not offer or eat the Passover lamb were an apostate, a servant, an uncircumcised man, a person in a state of ritual impurity except when a majority of Jews are in such a state, and a Gentile. The offering had to be made before a quorum of 30. In the Temple, the Levites sang Hallel while the priests performed the sacrificial service. Men and women were equally obligated regarding the offering (Pesahim 91b).

Today, in the absence of the Temple, when no sacrifices are offered or eaten, the mitzvah of the sacrifice is memorialized in the Seder Korban Pesach, a set of scriptural and Rabbinic passages dealing with the Passover sacrifice, customarily recited after the Mincha (afternoon prayer) service on the 14th of Nisan, and in the form of the zeroa, a symbolic food placed on the Passover Seder Plate (but not eaten), which is usually a roasted shankbone (or a chicken wing or neck). The eating of the afikoman substitutes for the eating of the sacrifice at the end of the Seder meal (Mishnah Pesachim 119a). Many Sephardic Jews have the custom of eating lamb or goat meat during the Seder in memory of the sacrifice.

== Matzah ==
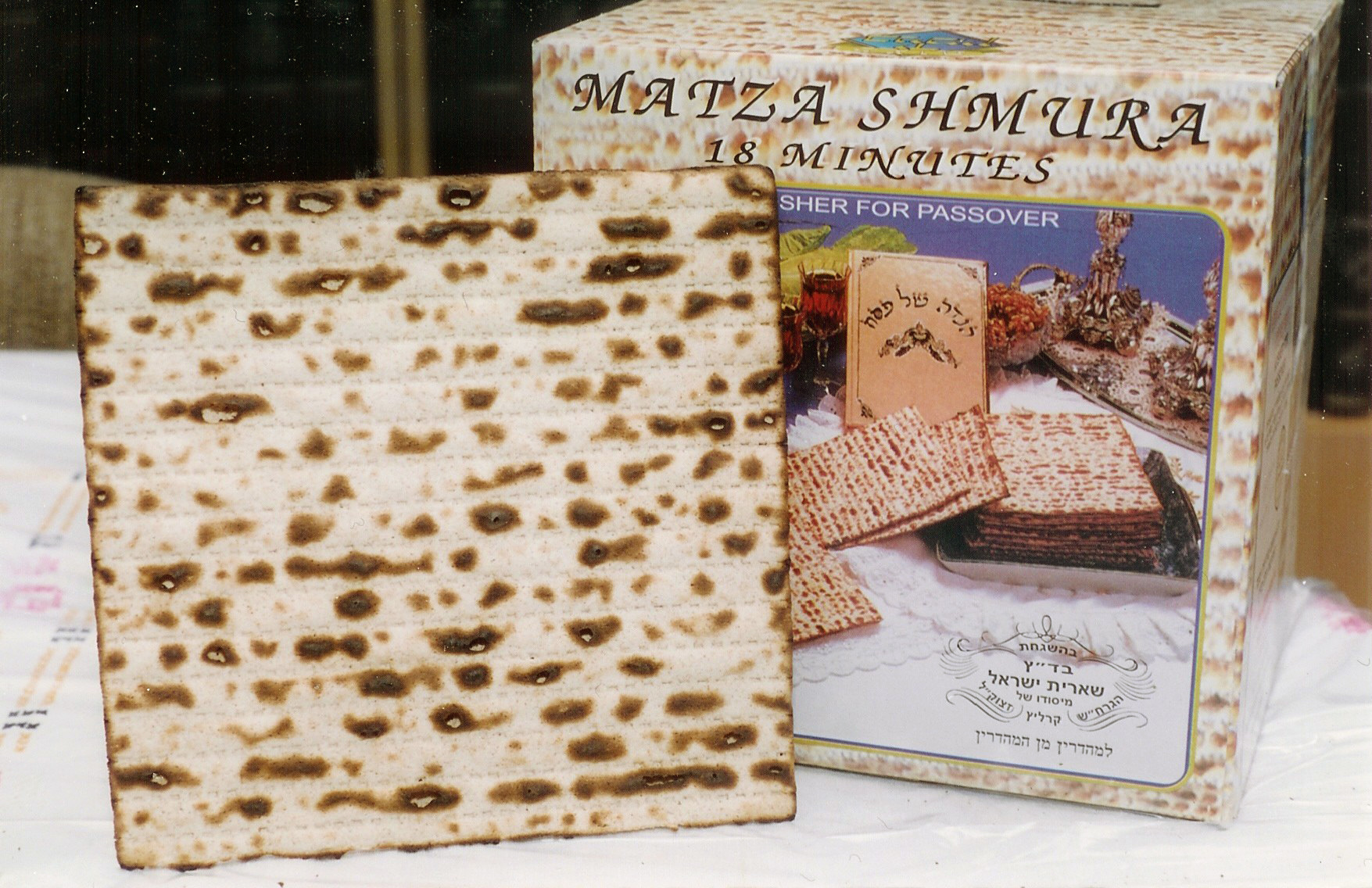
Machine-made shmura matza

A symbol of the Passover holiday is matzah, an unleavened flatbread made solely from flour and water which is continually worked from mixing through baking, so that it is not allowed to rise. Matzo may be made by machine or by hand. The Torah contains an instruction to eat matzah, specifically, on the first night of Passover and to eat only unleavened bread (in practice, matzah) during the entire week of Passover. Consequently, the eating of matzah figures prominently in the Passover Seder. There are several explanations for this.

The Torah says that it is because the Hebrews left Egypt with such haste that there was no time to allow baked bread to rise; thus flat, unleavened bread, matzah, is a reminder of the rapid departure of the Exodus. Other scholars teach that in the time of the Exodus, matzah was commonly baked to travel because it preserved well and was light to carry (making it similar to hardtack), suggesting that matzah was baked intentionally for the long journey ahead.

Matzo has also been called Lechem Oni (Hebrew: "bread of poverty"). There is an attendant explanation that matzah serves as a symbol to remind Jews what it is like to be a poor slave and to promote humility, appreciate freedom, and avoid the inflated ego symbolized by more luxurious leavened bread.

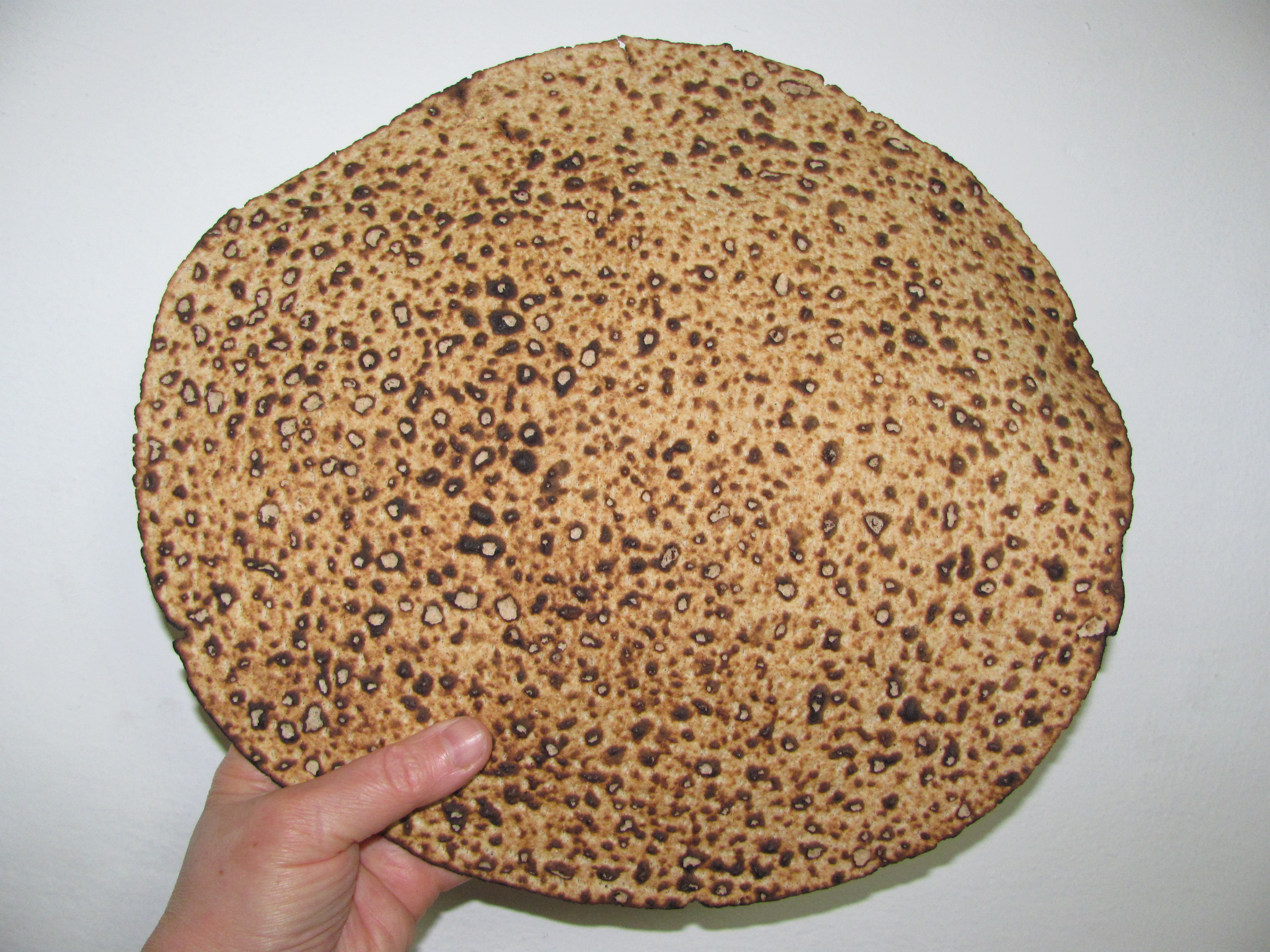
Hand-made shmura matzah

Shmura matzah ("watched" or "guarded" matzah), is the bread of preference for the Passover Seder in Orthodox Jewish communities. Shmura matzah is made from wheat that is guarded from contamination by leaven from the time of summer harvest to its baking into matzot five to ten months later.

In the weeks before Passover, matzot are prepared for holiday consumption. In many Orthodox Jewish communities, men traditionally gather in groups to bake handmade matzah for use at the Seder, the dough being rolled by hand, resulting in a large and round matzah. Groups also work together in machine-made matzah factories, which produce the typically square-shaped matzah sold in stores.

The baking of matzah is labour-intensive, as less than 18 minutes is permitted between the mixing of flour and water to the conclusion of baking and removal from the oven. Consequently, only a small number of matzot can be baked at one time, and the group members are enjoined to work the dough constantly so that it is not allowed to ferment and rise. A special cutting tool is run over the dough just before baking to prick any bubbles which might make the matza puff up; this creates the familiar dotted holes in the matzah.

After the matzot come out of the oven, the entire work area is scrubbed down and swept to make sure that no pieces of old, potentially leavened dough remain, as any stray pieces are now hametz and can contaminate the next batch of matzah.

Some machine-made matzot are completed within five minutes of being kneaded.

== Passover seder ==
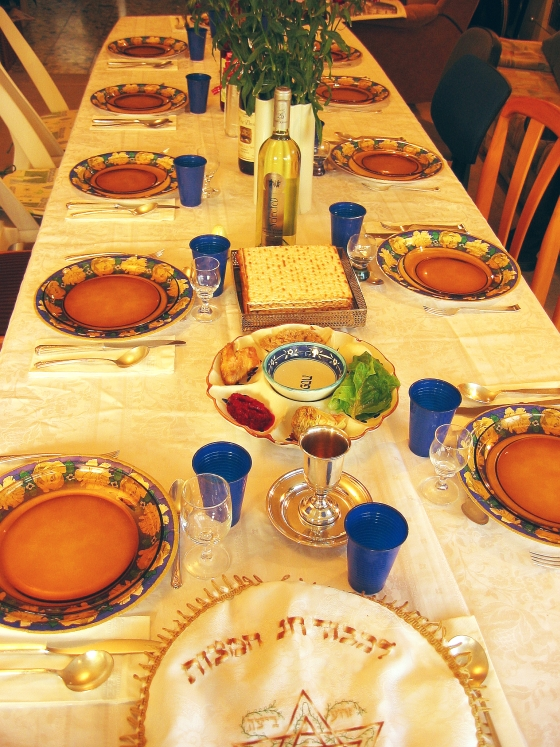
Table set for the Passover Seder

It is traditional for Jewish families to gather on the first night of Passover (first two nights in Orthodox and Conservative communities outside Israel) for a special dinner called a seder (Hebrew: סדר seder – derived from the Hebrew word for "order" or "arrangement", referring to the very specific order of the ritual). The table is set with the finest china and silverware to reflect the importance of the meal. During this meal, the story of the Exodus from Egypt is retold using a special text called the Haggadah. A total of four cups of wine are consumed during the recitation of the Haggadah. The seder is divided by the haggadah into the following 15 parts:

1. Qāḏēš קָדֵשׁ: recital of the Kiddush and drinking of the first cup of wine
2. Urḥaṣ ורחץ lit. '"and wash"': the washing of the hands – without blessing
3. Karpas כרפס: dipping of the karpas in salt water
4. Yaḥaṣ יחץ: breaking the middle matzah; the larger piece becomes the afikoman which is eaten later during the ritual of Ṣafun
5. Maggiḏ מגיד: retelling the Passover story, including the recital of "the four questions" and drinking of the second cup of wine
6. Raḥṣā רחצה: second washing of the hands – with blessing
7. Moṣi מוציא: traditional blessing before eating bread products
8. Maṣā מצה: blessing before eating matzah
9. Maror מרור: eating of the maror
10. Korēḵ כורך: eating of a sandwich made of matzah and maror
11. Shulḥān ʿorēḵ שולחן עורך: lit. "set table" – the serving of the holiday meal
12. Ṣafun צפון: eating of the afikoman
13. Bareich/ Barēkh ברך: blessing after the meal and drinking of the third cup of wine
14. Hallel הלל: recital of the Hallel, traditionally recited on festivals; drinking of the fourth cup of wine
15. Nirṣā נירצה: conclusion

These 15 parts parallel the 15 steps in the Temple in Jerusalem on which the Levites stood during Temple services, and which were memorialized in the 15 Psalms (#120–134) known as Shir HaMa'a lot (Hebrew: שיר המעלות shiyr ha-ma'alôth, "Songs of Ascent").

The seder is replete with questions, answers, and unusual practices (e.g. the recital of Kiddush which is not immediately followed by the blessing over bread, which is the traditional procedure for all other holiday meals) to arouse the interest and curiosity of the children at the table. The children are also rewarded with nuts and candies when they ask questions and participate in the discussion of the Exodus and its aftermath. Likewise, they are encouraged to search for the afikoman, the piece of matzah which is the last thing eaten at the seder. Audience participation and interaction is the rule, and many families' seders last long into the night with animated discussions and singing. The seder concludes with additional songs of praise and faith printed in the Haggadah, including Chad Gadya ("One Little Kid" or "One Little Goat").

=== Maror ===
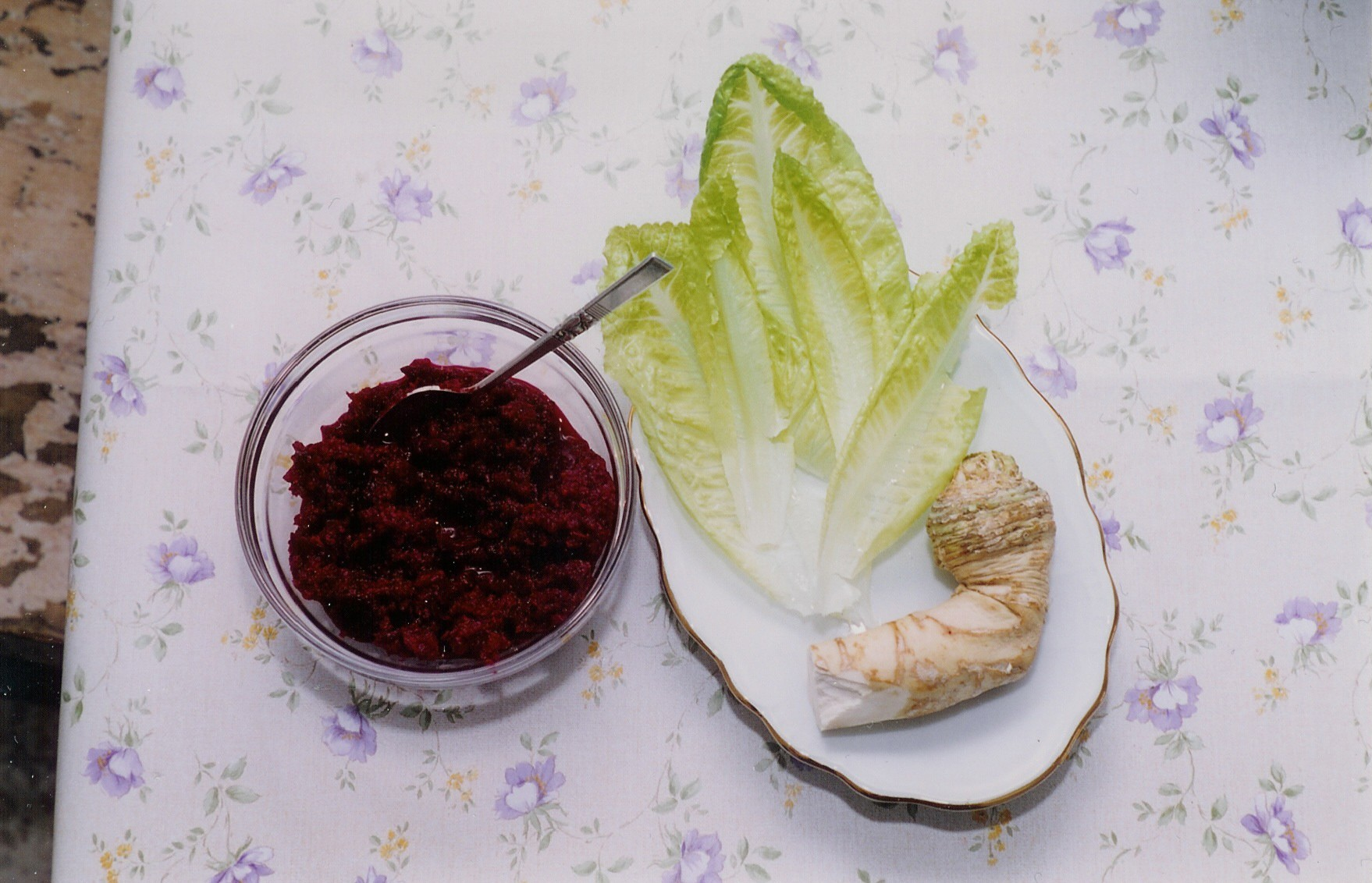
Types of maror: grated horseradish, romaine lettuce, whole horseradish root

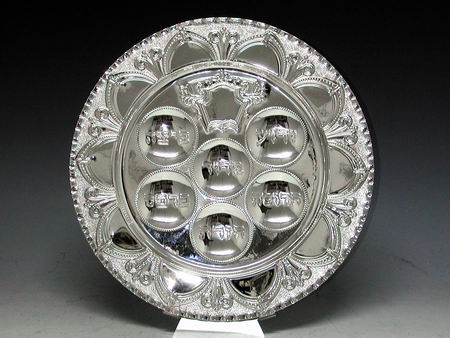
Silver seder plate

Maror (bitter herbs) symbolizes the bitterness of slavery in Egypt. The following verse from the Torah underscores that symbolism: "And they embittered (Hebrew: וימררו ve-yimareru) their lives with hard labor, with mortar and with bricks and with all manner of labor in the field; any labor that they made them do was with hard labor" (Exodus 1:14).

=== Four cups of wine ===
There is a Rabbinic requirement that four cups of wine are to be drunk during the seder meal. This applies to both men and women. The Mishnah says (Pes. 10:1) that even the poorest man in Israel must drink. Each cup is connected to a different part of the seder: the first cup is for Kiddush, the second cup is connected with the recounting of the Exodus, the drinking of the third cup concludes Birkat Hamazon and the fourth cup is associated with Hallel. A fifth cup of wine is poured near the end of the seder for the prophet Elijah, a symbol of the future redemption, which is left un-touched.

=== The four questions and participation of children ===
Children have a very important role in the Passover seder. Traditionally the youngest child is prompted to ask questions about the Passover seder, beginning with the words, Mah Nishtana HaLeila HaZeh (Why is this night different from all other nights?). The questions encourage the gathering to discuss the significance of the symbols in the meal. The questions asked by the child are:

Why is this night different from all other nights?
On all other nights, we eat either unleavened or leavened bread, but tonight we eat only unleavened bread?
On all other nights, we eat all kinds of vegetables, but tonight, we eat only bitter herbs?
On all other nights, we do not dip [our food] even once, but tonight we dip twice?
On all other nights, we eat either sitting or reclining, but tonight we only recline?

Often the leader of the seder and the other adults at the meal will use prompted responses from the Haggadah, which states, "The more one talks about the Exodus from Egypt, the more praiseworthy he is." Many readings, prayers, and stories are used to recount the story of the Exodus. Many households add their own commentary and interpretation and often the story of the Jews is related to the theme of liberation and its implications worldwide.

=== Afikoman ===
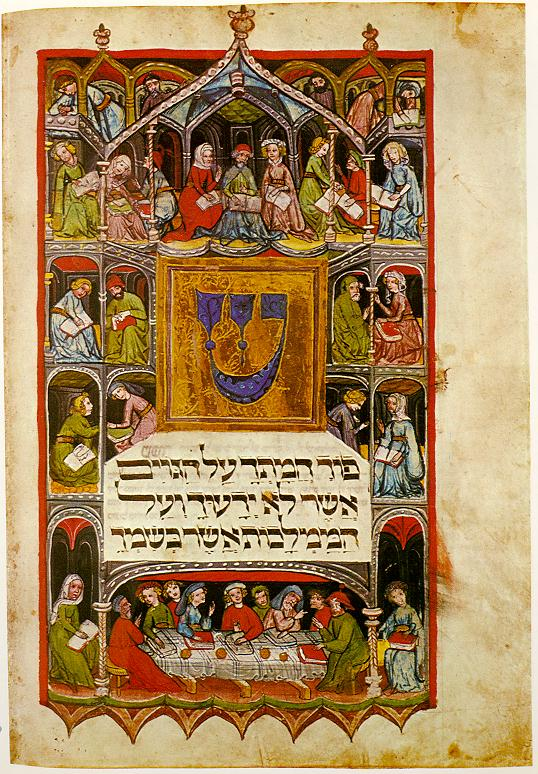
14th century Haggadah

The afikoman – an integral part of the Seder itself – is used to engage the interest and excitement of the children at the table. During the fourth part of the Seder, called Yachatz, the leader breaks the middle piece of matzah into two. He sets aside the larger portion as the afikoman. Many families use the afikoman as a device for keeping the children awake and alert throughout the Seder proceedings by hiding the afikoman and offering a prize for its return. Alternatively, the children are allowed to "steal" the afikoman and demand a reward for its return. In either case, the afikoman must be consumed during the twelfth part of the Seder, Tzafun.

=== Concluding songs ===
After the Hallel, the fourth glass of wine is drunk, and participants recite a prayer that ends in "Next year in Jerusalem!". This is followed by several lyric prayers that expound upon God's mercy and kindness, and give thanks for the survival of the Jewish people through a history of exile and hardship. "Echad Mi Yodea" ("Who Knows One?") is a playful song, testing the general knowledge of the children (and the adults). Some of these songs, such as "Chad Gadya" are allegorical.

== Hallel ==
During Passover, the recitation of Hallel a collection of Psalms praising and thanking God, is an integral part of the daily prayer service. On the initial day(s) of Passover, it is recited in its entirety, similar to the practice observed on Shavuot and throughout Succot. However, for the subsequent days of the Passover holiday, only half of the Hallel is recited. This traditional practice is widely observed by adherents of the Jewish faith as a way of expressing gratitude and celebrating the significance of Passover, while maintaining variations in the recitation of Hallel based on specific days within the festival.

== Counting of the Omer ==
Beginning on the second night of Passover, the 16th day of Nisan, Jews begin the practice of the Counting of the Omer, a nightly reminder of the approach of the holiday of Shavuot 50 days hence. Each night after the evening prayer service, men and women recite a special blessing and then enumerate the day of the Omer. On the first night, for example, they say, "Today is the first day in (or, to) the Omer"; on the second night, "Today is the second day in the Omer." The counting also involves weeks; thus, the seventh day is commemorated, "Today is the seventh day, which is one week in the Omer." The eighth day is marked, "Today is the eighth day, which is one week and one day in the Omer," etc.

When the Temple stood in Jerusalem, a sheaf of new-cut barley was presented before the altar on the second day of Unleavened Bread (Passover). Josephus writes:

On the second day of unleavened bread, that is to say the sixteenth, our people partake of the crops which they have reaped and which have not been touched till then, and esteeming it right first to do homage to God, to whom they owe the abundance of these gifts, they offer to him the first-fruits of the barley in the following way. After parching and crushing the little sheaf of ears and purifying the barley for grinding, they bring to the altar an issaron for God, and, having flung a handful thereof on the altar, they leave the rest for the use of the priests. Thereafter all are permitted, publicly or individually, to begin harvest.

Since the destruction of the Temple, this offering is brought in word rather than deed.

One explanation for the Counting of the Omer is that it shows the connection between Passover and Shavuot. The physical freedom that the Hebrews achieved at the Exodus from Egypt was only the beginning of a process that climaxed with the spiritual freedom they gained at the giving of the Torah at Mount Sinai. Another explanation is that the newborn nation which emerged after the Exodus needed time to learn their new responsibilities vis-a-vis Torah and mitzvot before accepting God's law. The distinction between the Omer offering – a measure of barley, typically animal fodder – and the Shavuot offering – two loaves of wheat bread, human food – symbolizes the transition process.

== Chol HaMoed: The intermediate days of Passover ==
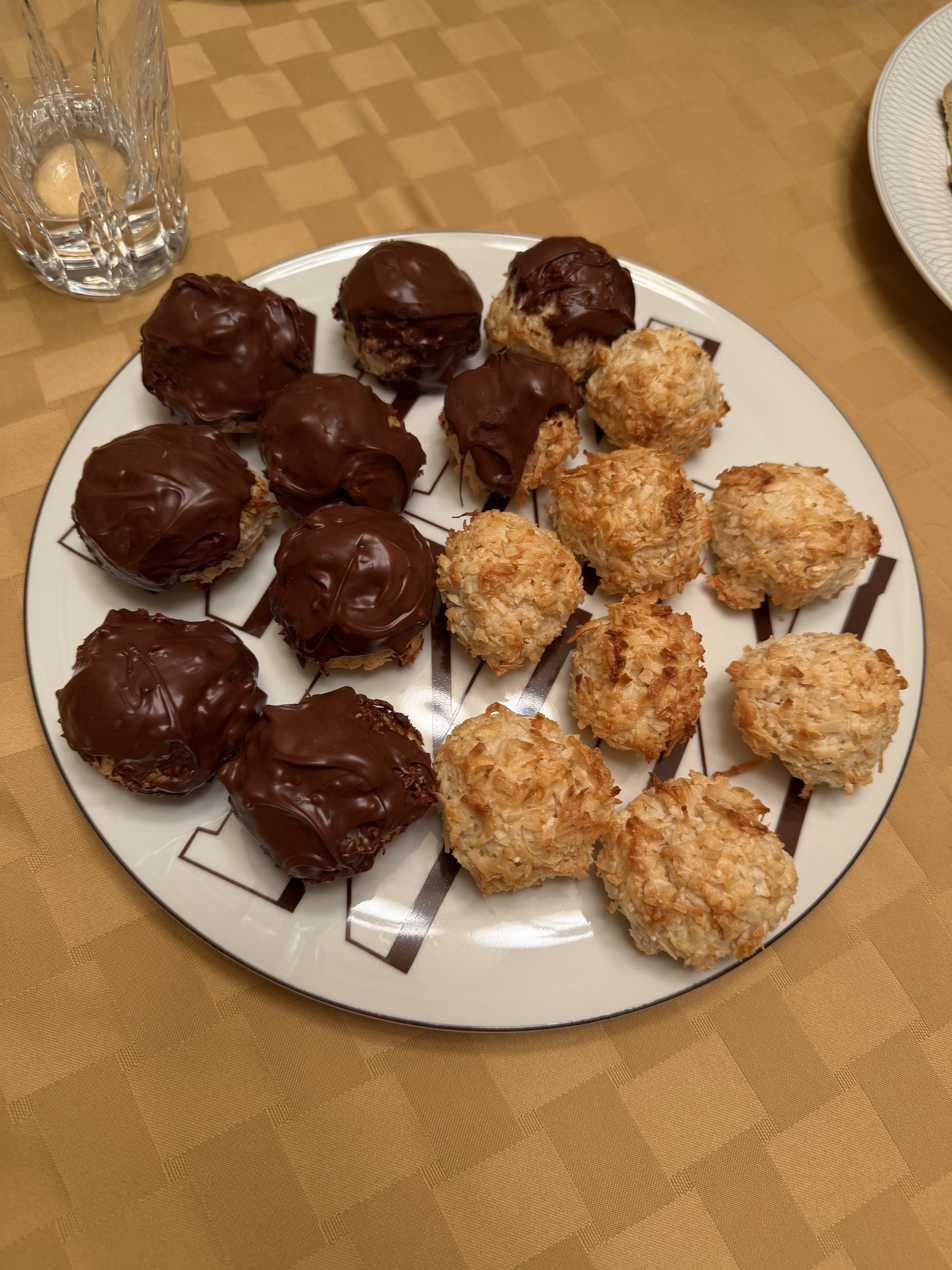
A plate of chocolate and plain macaroons made for Passover

In Israel, Passover lasts for seven days with the first and last days being major Jewish holidays. In Orthodox and Conservative communities, no work is performed on those days, with most of the rules relating to the observances of Shabbat being applied.

Outside Israel, in Orthodox and Conservative communities, the holiday lasts for eight days with the first two days and last two days being major holidays. In the intermediate days necessary work can be performed. Reform Judaism observes Passover over seven days, with the first and last days being major holidays.

Like the holiday of Sukkot, the intermediary days of Passover are known as Chol HaMoed (festival weekdays) and are imbued with a semi-festive status. It is a time for family outings and picnic lunches of matzah, hardboiled eggs, fruits and vegetables, and Passover treats such as macaroons and homemade candies.

Passover cake recipes call for potato starch or Passover cake flour made from finely granulated matzah instead of regular flour, and a large amount of eggs to achieve fluffiness. Cookie recipes use matzah farfel (broken bits of matzah) or ground nuts as the base. For families with Eastern European backgrounds, borsht, a soup made with beets, is a Passover tradition.

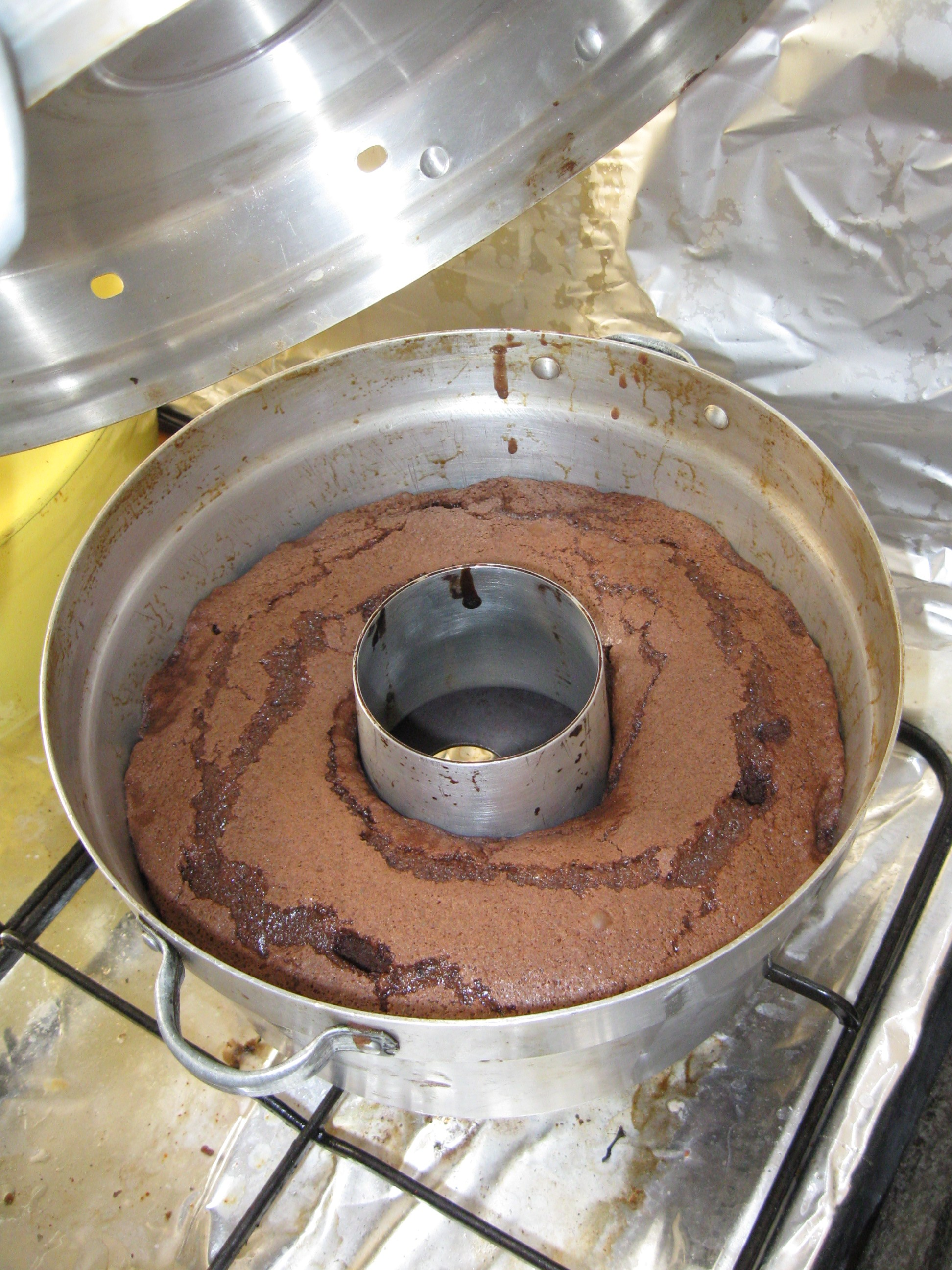
A Passover brownie cake baked in a Wonder Pot

While kosher for Passover packaged goods are available in stores, some families opt to cook everything from scratch during Passover week. In Israel, families that do not kasher their ovens can bake cakes, casseroles, and even meat on the stovetop in a Wonder Pot, an Israeli invention consisting of three parts: an aluminium pot shaped like a Bundt pan, a hooded cover perforated with venting holes, and a thick, round, metal disc with a center hole which is placed between the Wonder Pot and the flame to disperse heat.

== Seventh day of Passover ==
Shevi'i shel Pesach (שביעי של פסח, 'seventh [day] of Passover') is another full Jewish holiday, with special prayer services and festive meals. Outside of Israel, in the Jewish diaspora, Shvi'i shel Pesach is celebrated on both the seventh and eighth days of Passover. This holiday commemorates the day the Children of Israel reached the Red Sea and witnessed both the miraculous "Splitting of the Sea" (Passage of the Red Sea), the drowning of all the Egyptian chariots, horses and soldiers that pursued them. According to the Midrash, only the Pharaoh was spared to give testimony to the miracle that occurred.

Hasidic Rebbes traditionally hold a tish on the night of Shvi'i shel Pesach and place a cup or bowl of water on the table before them. They use this opportunity to speak about the Splitting of the Sea to their disciples, and sing songs of praise to God.

== Second Passover ==
The "Second Passover" (Pesach Sheni) on the 14th of Iyar in the Hebrew calendar is mentioned in the Hebrew Bible's Book of Numbers as a make-up day for people who were unable to offer the pesach sacrifice at the appropriate time due to ritual impurity or distance from Jerusalem. Just as on the first Pesach night, breaking bones from the second Paschal offering or leaving meat over until morning is prohibited.

Today, Pesach Sheni on the 14th of Iyar has the status of a very minor holiday. There are no special prayers or observances, except that in some communities Tachanun, a penitential prayer omitted on holidays, is not said. There is a custom, although not Jewish law, to eat a piece of matzah on that night.

== Notable events on Passover ==
Biblical

1. Abel offered the lamb which was accepted.
2. The war of Abraham and the four kings when he went to rescue Lot.
3. The Covenant Between the Parts (1743 BCE): God forged a special covenant with Abraham. Genesis 15:13–18
4. Abraham receives three visitors and prepares a meal for them. He receives the promise that Sarah will have a child next year.
5. The two angels go to Lot's house and spend the night with Lot. The next morning Sodom is destroyed.
6. Isaac was born on the first day of Passover. The Akedah happened on the same day as well, years later.
7. Issac asking Esau to prepare a meal for him so he can bless him.
8. Jacob wrestles with an angel and his name is changed to Israel. Genesis 32:25–29
9. Moses at the burning bush. One year before the exodus, God speaks to Moses from the burning bush to go and deliver Israel.
10. The Exodus. The children of Israel were protected by the blood of the lamb during the plague of the death of the firstborn. They were miraculously healed that night and walked out of Egypt in the morning. God gave them favour with their neighbors and they asked and received precious articles which was used to build the tabernacle.
11. Gideon's victory over Midian and the barley cake dream.
12. King Hezekiah was healed and the Assyrian army defeated by an angel, killing 185,000 soldiers.
13. Queen Vashti is executed by King Achashverosh paving the way for Esther to become queen.
14. Esther's fast was proclaimed during the Passover. Haman erected the gallows for Mordecai on the first night of the Passover. The same night, King Ahasuerus could not sleep and that resulted in the downfall of Haman.
15. Daniel spends a night in the Lion's Den.
16. King Belshazzar of Babylon made use of the vessels of the temple and was subsequently judged by the handwriting on the wall.

Modern day

1. 1979 – Uganda – Judaism was banned by Idi Amin in 1971. On Wednesday, 11 April 1979, corresponding to 14 Nisan 5739, Passover Night the new Government, composed of Ugandan rebels and Tanzanian troops, declared freedom of worship. And Passover was commemorated.

== Traditional foods ==
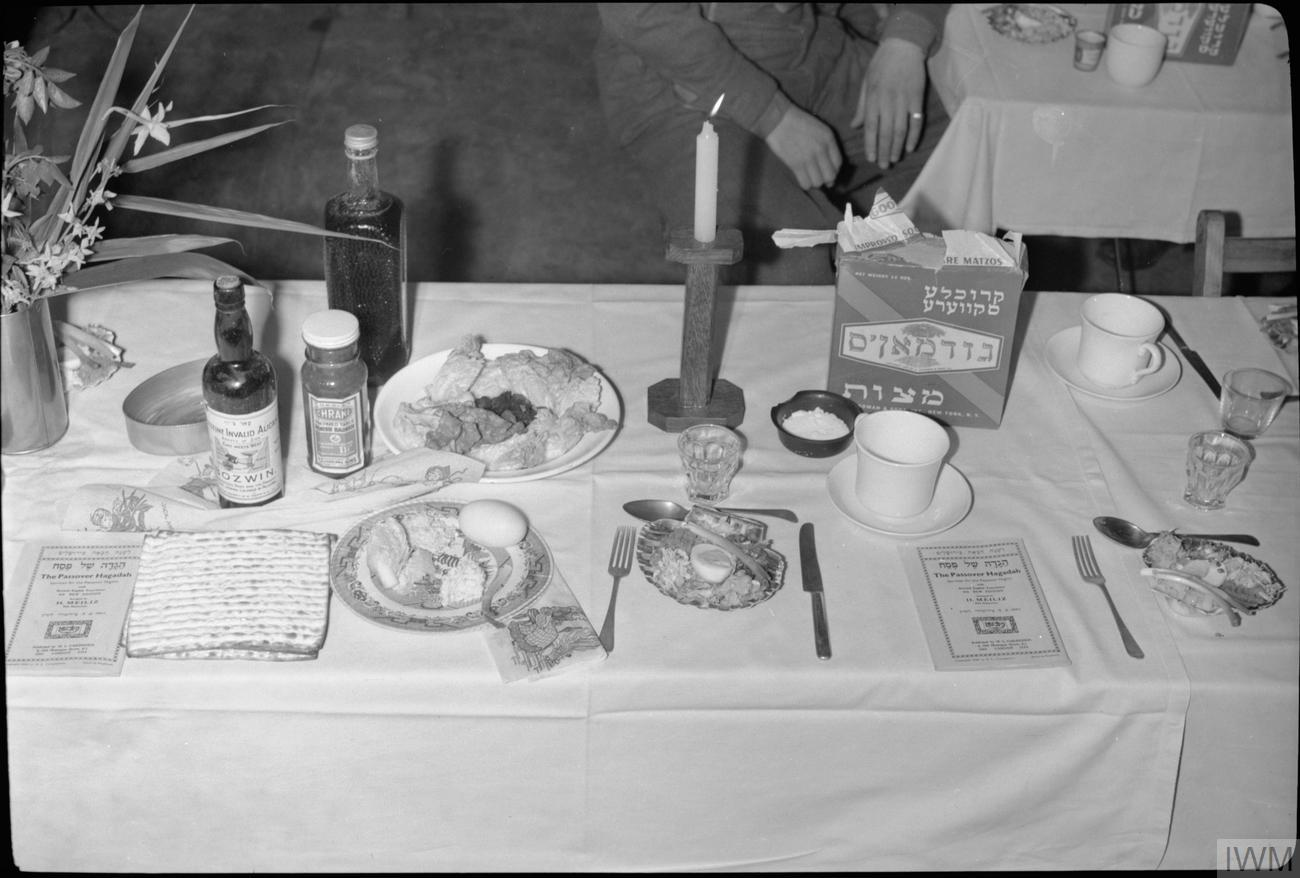
A table set for a Passover ceremony for hundreds of service personnel, somewhere near London. The Passover meal consists of a salad of bitter herbs, egg, and matzah (April 1944).

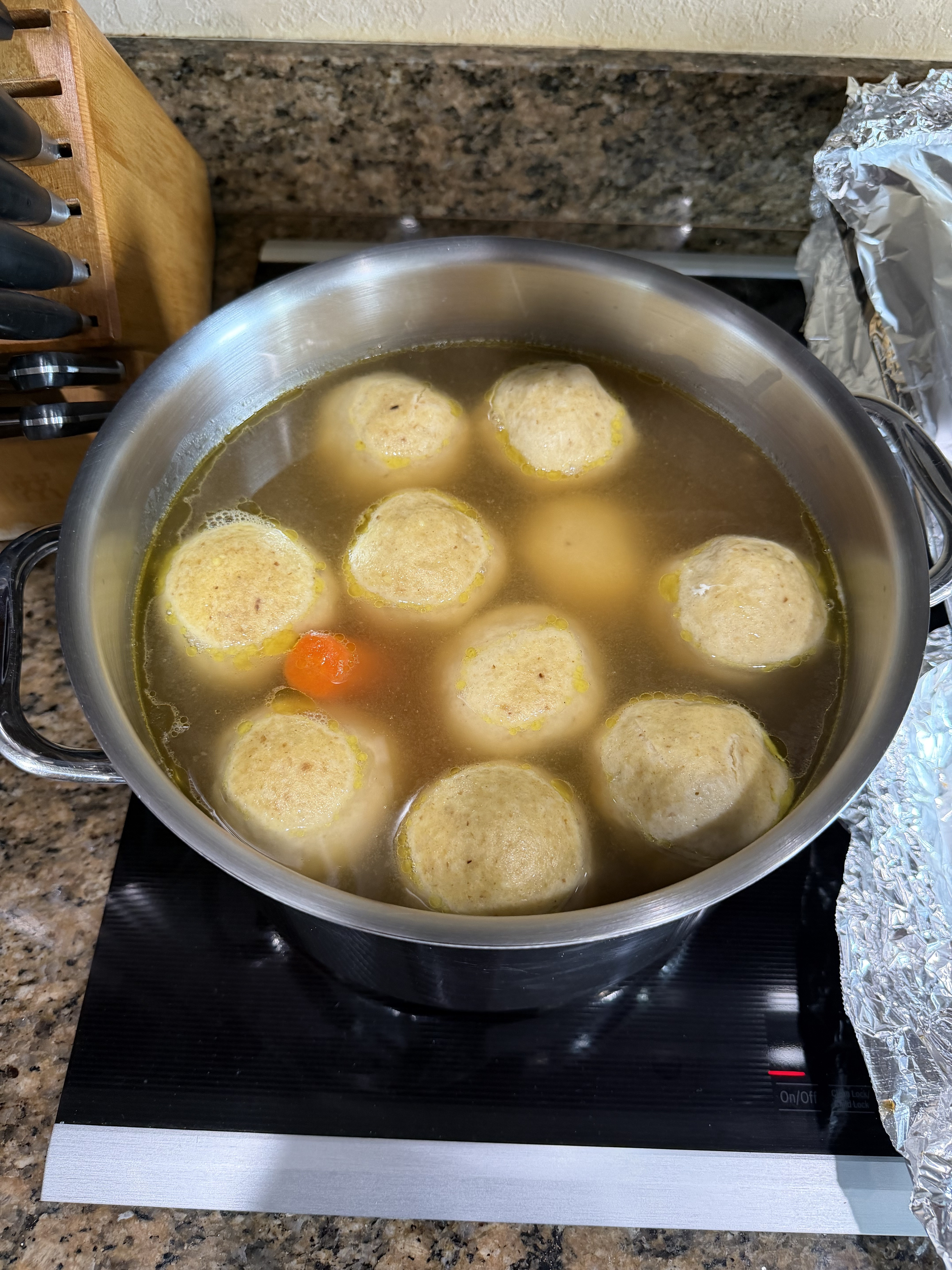
A pot of matzah ball soup for a Passover seder

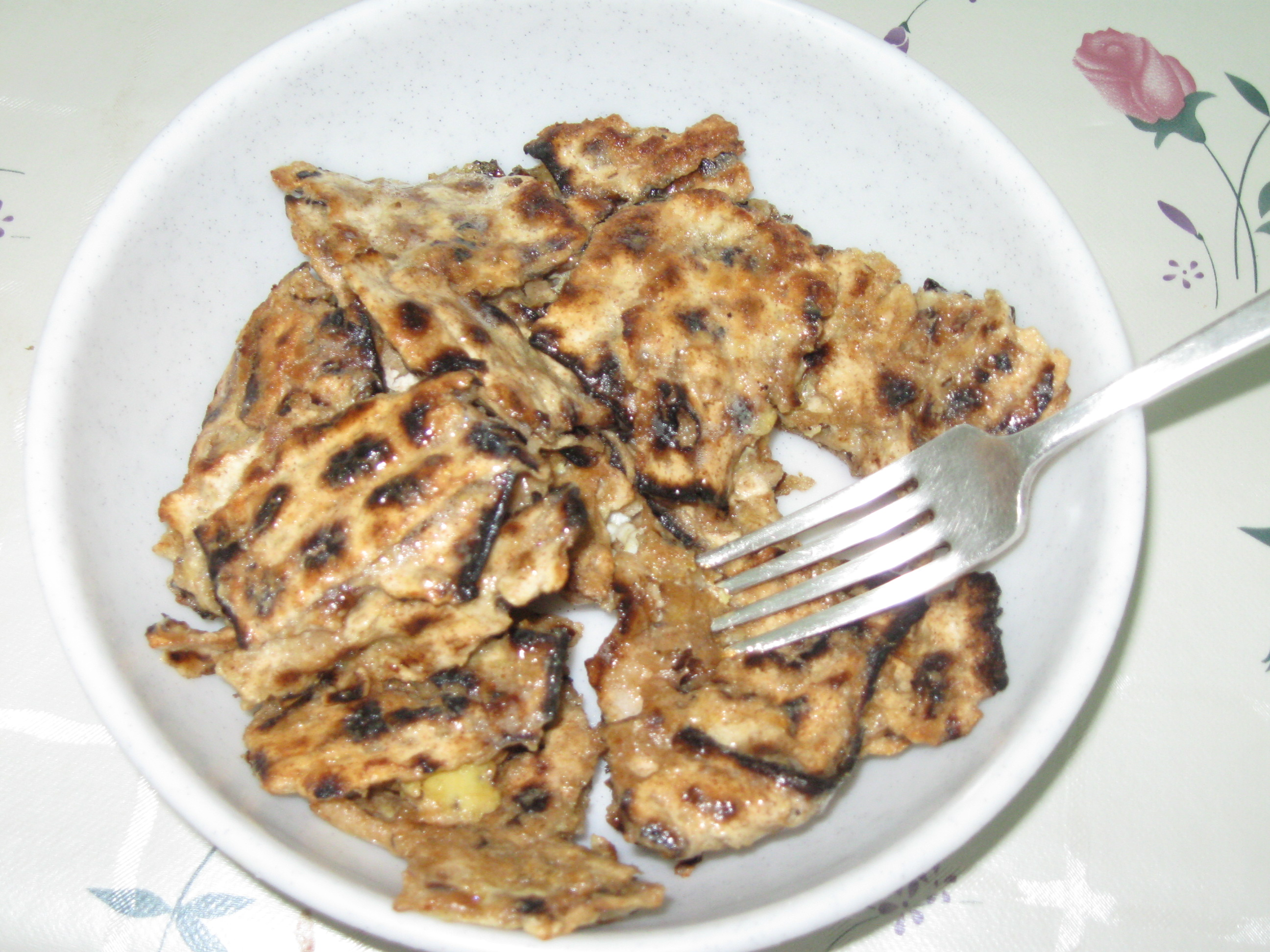
Matzah brei (fried matzah and egg), a popular Passover dish

Because the house is free of leaven (chametz) for eight days, the Jewish household typically eats different foods during the week of Passover. Some include:

Ashkenazi foods

- Matzah brei: Matzo softened in milk or water and fried with egg and fat; served either savory or sweet
- Matzo kugel: A kugel made with matzah instead of noodles
- Charoset: A sweet mixture of fruit, fresh, dried or both; nuts; spices; honey; and sometimes wine. The charoset is a symbol of the mortar the Israelites used for building while enslaved in Egypt (See Passover seder)
- Chrain: Horseradish and beet relish
- Gefilte fish: Poached fish patties or fish balls made from a mixture of ground, de-boned fish, mostly carp or pike
- Chicken soup with matzah balls (kneydlach): Chicken soup served with matzah-meal dumplings
- Passover noodles: Noodles prepared from potato flour and eggs, served in soup. Batter is fried like thin crepes, which are stacked, rolled up and sliced into ribbons.

Sephardi foods

- Kafteikas di prasa: Fried balls made of leeks, meat, and matzah meal
- Lamb or chicken leg: A symbol of God's strong hand and the sacrifice
- Mina (pastel di pesach): a meat or spinach pie made with matzot
- Sephardi Charoset is usually made of figs, raisins and dates. Egyptian Jews use dates, raisins, walnuts, cinnamon, and sweet wine, while Greek and Turkish Jews use apples, dates, chopped almonds, and wine. Italian Jews add chestnuts. Iraqi Jews make charoset from a mixture of dates and nuts.
- Spring green vegetables: artichoke, fava beans, peas

== Related celebrations, sermons, liturgy, and song in other religions ==
- That slaves can go free, and that the future can be better than the present, has inspired a number of religious sermons, prayers, and songs – including spirituals (what used to be called "Negro Spirituals"), within the African-American community. Philip R. Alstat, known for his fiery rhetoric and powerful oratory skills, wrote and spoke in 1939 about the power of the Passover story during the rise of Nazi persecution and terror:
- Saint Thomas Syrian Christians observe Maundy Thursday as Pesaha, a Malayalam word derived from the Aramaic or Hebrew word for Passover (Pasha, Pesach or Pesah) The tradition of consuming Pesaha Appam after the church service is observed by the entire community under the leadership of the head of the family.
- The Samaritan religion celebrates its own, similar Passover holiday, based on the Samaritan Pentateuch. Passover is also celebrated in Karaite Judaism, which rejects the Oral Torah that characterizes mainstream Rabbinic Judaism, as well as other groups claiming affiliation with Israelites.
- Christianity celebrates Easter (not to be confused with the pre-Christian Saxon festival from which it derives its English name). The coincidence of Jesus' crucifixion with the Jewish Passover led some early Christians to make a false etymological association between Hebrew Pesach and Greek pascho ("suffer"). Because Easter's date in the calendar is related to lunar phases, Easter often falls on the same week as Passover but this is not necessarily the case; for example, the first full moon after the equinox might happen during the month of Adar.
- In Islam, Ashura commemorates Moses's escape from Egypt through two days of fasting on 10th Muharram.
- The 2014-published The Legislative Themes of Centralization: From Mandate to Demise ties Passover to apotropaic rite, unrelated to the Exodus.

== Environmental links ==
Some see in Passover an important ecological lesson important to the contemporary situation with different ecological threats like climate change. For example, Rabbi Yonatan Neril, founder and executive director of the Interfaith Center for Sustainable Development, compares the impact of climate change to the Plagues of Egypt and the refusal of modern society to change its way of thinking to the refusal of the Pharaoh to free the Jewish slaves. Scientists discovered evidence for climatic change at the end of the rule of Ramesses II, which could potentially impact the flow of the Nile, leading to red algae bloom. This could explain what is described as the ten plagues. According to Neril: "The Egyptians were very happy to have a free source of labor in the form of Israelite slaves. When God said this needs to stop, they were reluctant to change…Fossil fuels, in the past 150 years, have replaced slave labor as the key driver of human society. There's a Pharaoh within us that wants to continue to do something that's not right."

== See also ==
- Ashura
- Easter
- The Exodus Decoded
- Gebrochts
- Jewish greetings
- Kitniyot
