= Bedikat Chametz =

Ritual pre-Passover search for chametz

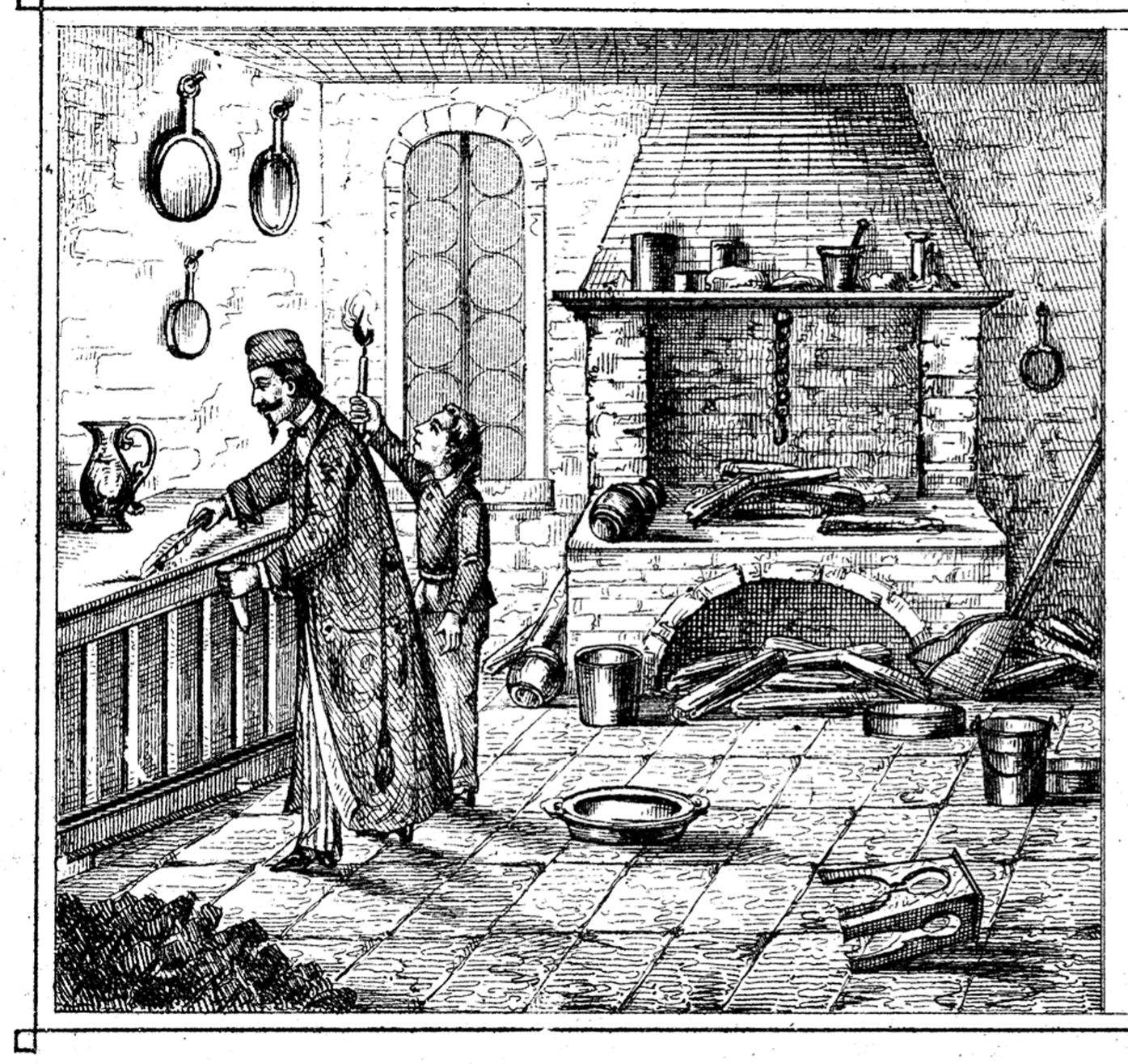
An Italian bediqat chametz (1864)

Bedikat chametz, or bedikas chametz (בְּדִיקַת חָמֵץ, Tiberian: bəḏīqaṯ ḥāmēṡ) is the Mitzva to search for chametz before the Jewish Holiday of Passover. The search takes place after nightfall on the evening before Pesach (the night of the 14th of the Hebrew month of Nisan).

In Jewish law, there is an accepted three-step process for dealing with chametz before the Passover:

1. Searching for Ĥametz (Bedikat Chametz)
2. Elimination of chametz (Bitul chametz)
3. Removal of chametz (Biur chametz)

After the checking ceremony, the chametz is nullified; that is, a declaration is made that any chametz not found during the checking is considered like "the dust of the earth", and the next day the chametz that was found during the checking is burned. (The commandment is to do this through burning, but it can also be destroyed in other ways, such as throwing it into the sea).

== The Process ==
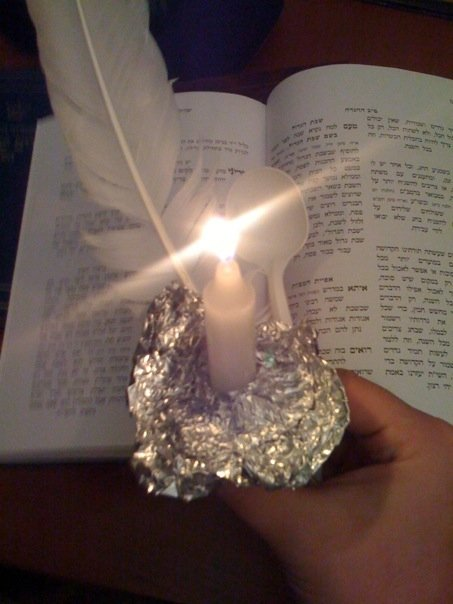
Bedikat chametz being performed on the night before Passover Eve

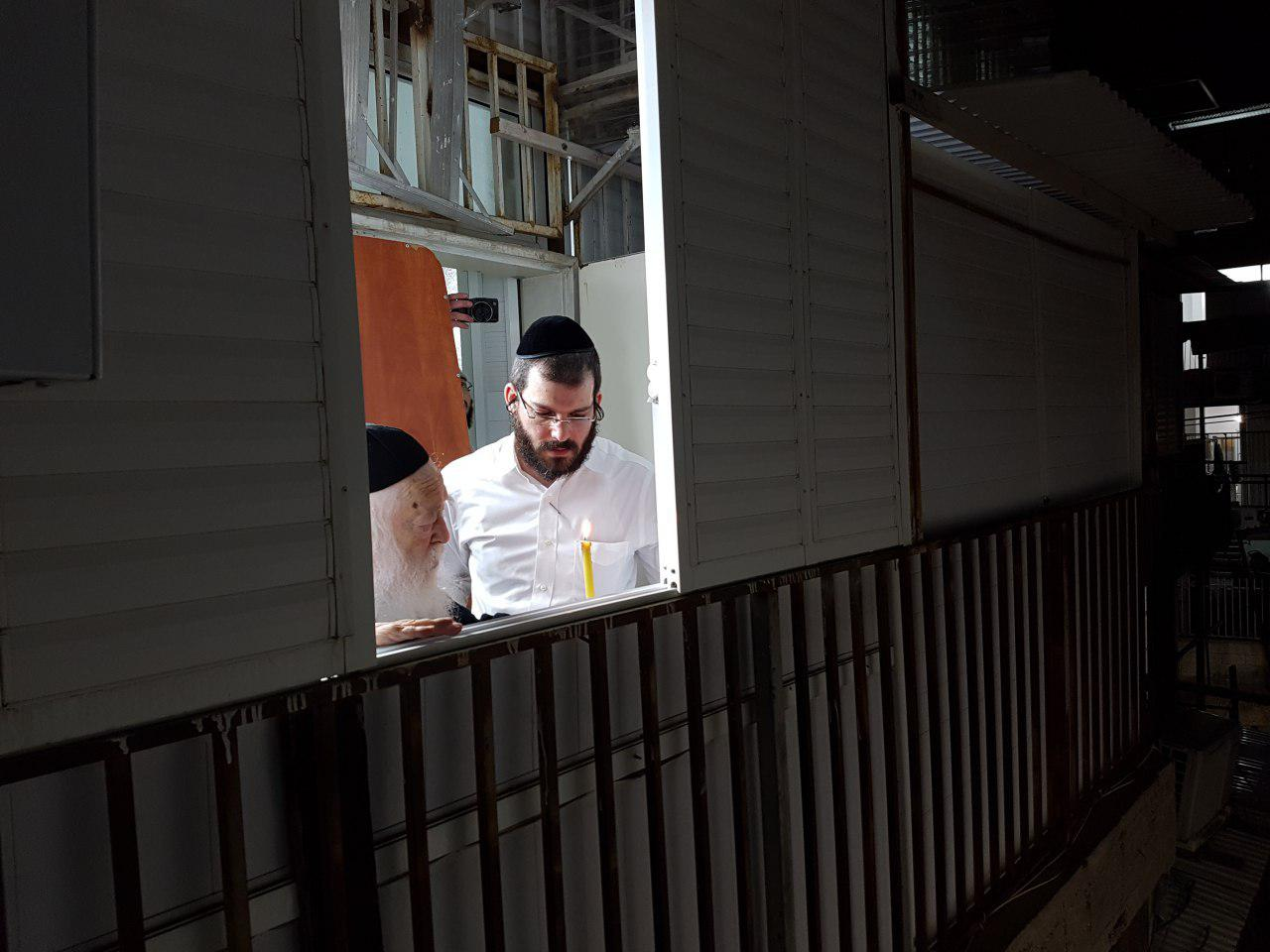
Rabbi Chaim Kanievsky conducting bedikat chametz

A candle is lit in addition to electric lights. Flashlights can be used to assist as well. A blessing is recited if the search is performed on the 14th (or on the 13th when the 14th is on a Friday), but not when an earlier search is performed for various reasons.

Since according to some, a blessing in vain – a bracha levatala – occurs if no chametz was found in the house, there is a widespread custom to 'seed' the area to be searched. Prior to bedikat chametz, several (usually ten) pieces of chametz are hidden around the house. These pieces must be small and should be wrapped so that crumbs do not escape.

There are those who traditionally use a feather and a wooden spoon are used, and whenever a piece of chametz is found (whether one of the hidden pieces or another that is discovered unexpectedly), the feather is used to sweep the piece of chametz into the wooden spoon, which is then used to place it in a bag. It is best to use a candle to illuminate the areas; however, it is perfectly acceptable to use a flashlight or other light source. In some traditions, searchers also carry a bell to announce the discovery of chametz.

The reasons for the candle, feather and spoon is as follows:

- Candle – candles illuminate and hyper focus their light on areas such as cracks and crevices.
- Feather – used throughout the year to egg the challah, and therefore burnt in the chametz.
- Wooden spoon – wooden spoons cannot be kashered and therefore "wooden" spoons that were imbued with the flavor of chametz were burnt together with the chametz.

It is for most very impractical following through with custom with above described tools.

Every part of every room of the house where chametz may possibly be found must be searched using this process. Rooms where chametz is not normally brought (such as a bathroom) need not be searched.

Modern versions of this tradition have adapted to include flashlights, glowsticks, and occasionally a roomba with a candle taped to the top.

== Earlier search ==
One who is leaving one's property prior to the night of the 14th, but is not selling the property, is required to perform a search without a blessing.

== Customs ==
The customary number of pieces of chametz to place is 10. This custom was first recorded in the Or Zarua II (c. 1300), which writes that "The first sages, those faithful men, would take ten pieces of bread and place them in ten corners. Then they would return to each corner and collect the piece, bless '. . . to destroy chametz' upon it, and bundle the pieces into a single vessel to burn on the next morning . . . to remind you of the ten impurities, in order to destroy them and remove them from the world."
