= Maharash Levi =

Greek rabbinic scholar (1532–1600)

Rabbi Shlomo ben Yitzchak Ha'Levi

Personal life
- Born: 1532 Salonica, Ottoman Empire
- Died: 1600 (aged 57–58) Salonica, Ottoman Empire
- Parent: Yitzchak (father)
- Occupation: Rabbinic scholar

Religious life
- Religion: Judaism

Shlomo ben Yitzchak HaLevi (Hebrew: שלמה בן יצחק לבית הלוי; 1532–1600) was a prominent rabbinic scholar in Thessaloniki, Greece, during the Jewish community's "Golden Age." Among his other duties, he served the exiled Jews from Évora, Portugal.

His grandson, Shlomo ben Yitzchak HaLevi II, is most well known for his responsa Maharash Levi (or Maharash L'veit HaLevi), published in Thessaloniki in 1652. These responsa are arranged according to the four-volume structural model of the Arba'ah Turim, and have been cited by such later rabbinic authorities as Rabbi Avraham Gombiner in his Magen Avraham.

== Selected works ==
- Levi, Solomon ben Isaac (1565). יצחק לבית הלוי הספרדי :ספר לב אבות (in Hebrew). יוסף בן יצחק יעבץ.
- בן יצחק, הלוי, שלמה (1596). דברי שלמה (in Hebrew). Venice. OCLC 233091882.
- בן יצחק, הלוי, שלמה (1600). חשק שלמה (in Hebrew). Salonica.
