= Matzo lasagna =

Jewish dish

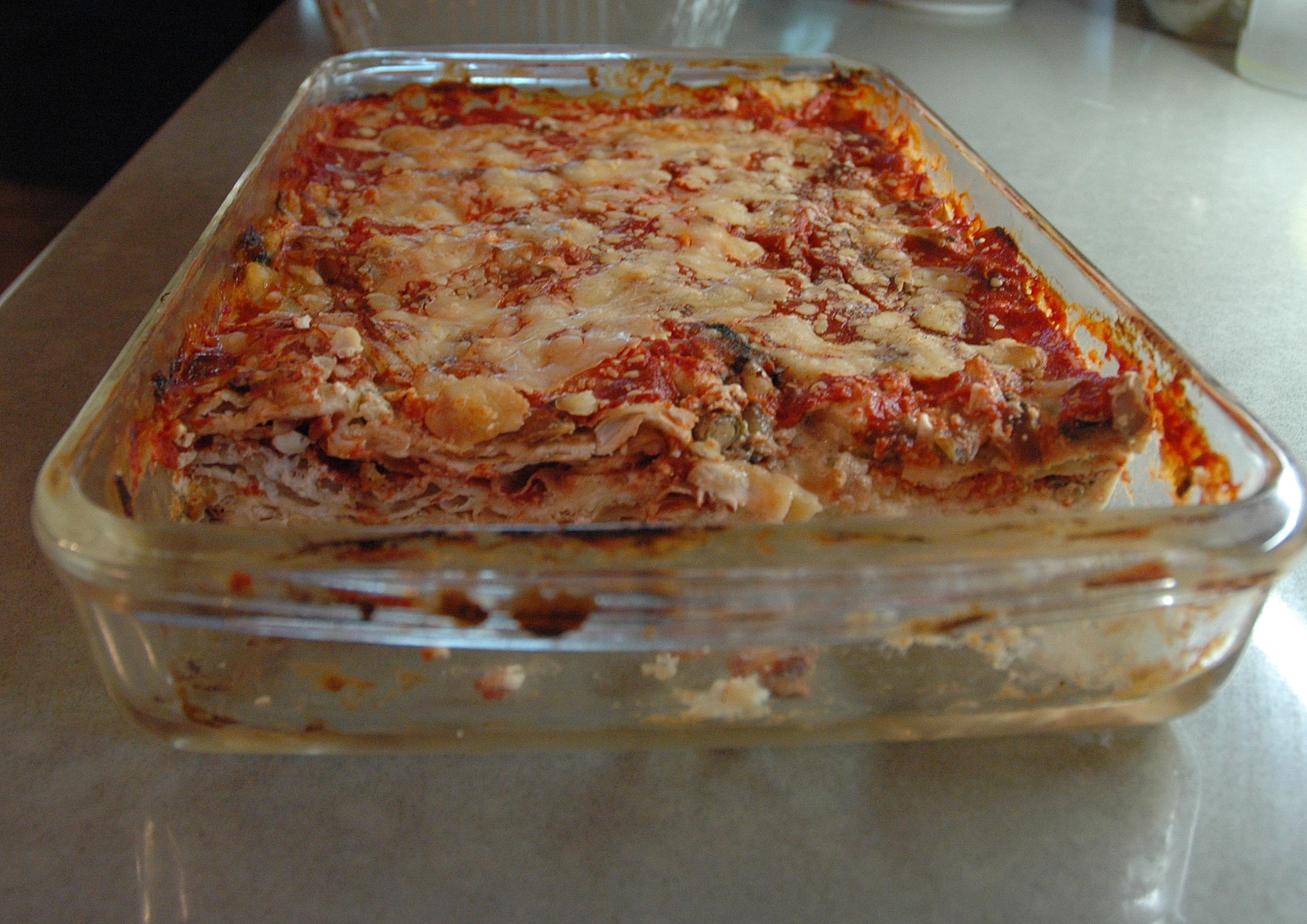
- Alternative names: Matzo lasagne, matzah lasagna, matzagna
- Course: Dinner
- Place of origin: Israel, North America, Italy, other communities in the diaspora
- Created by: Italian Jews
- Main ingredients: Matzo, soft cheese such as ricotta or cottage cheese, eggs, bechamel or tomato sauce, mozzarella, parmesan or pecorino, spinach, herbs and spices

Matzo lasagna (sometimes spelled matzah lasagna), also known as matzagna, is a Jewish type of lasagna made by layering sheets of matzo with typically a tomato or a bechamel sauce and various cheeses. It originated from the Italian Jews and is popular in Israel, the United States, and the rest of the diaspora. It is similar to the traditional Sephardic Jewish dish mina; though the fillings differ as mina is typically made with meat or a spinach and feta filling, while matzo lasagna is made with sauce and cheese.

== Background ==
During Passover, Jewish law prohibits the consumption of food items other than matzo that are made with wheat or other similar grains. Given these restrictions, some individuals will make lasagna by substituting matzo for traditional wheat pasta sheets. Some people substitute cottage cheese or farmers cheese and abstain from ricotta cheese during Passover as Kosher-for-Passover varieties are difficult to find.

== History ==
Matzo lasagna descended from a local Italian Jewish variant culinary tradition of Passover pies, or casseroles, called minas. Minas are composed of sheets of matzo layered with savory ingredients and baked. Some have ground lamb in a tomato sauce; others may be made with spinach and cheese similar to the Israeli bourekas but made with matzo instead of phyllo or puff pastry.

== Varieties ==
Matzo lasagna can be made with regular, shmura, egg matzo, or gluten-free matzo, and fillings include tomato sauce, ricotta cheese and mozzarella-basil filling, while some use fresh mozzarella, a spinach-ricotta filling, and cheese with ramps, peas, spinach, leeks, and chives.

== Preparation ==
Matzo lasagna is prepared by adding tomato sauce to the bottom of a casserole dish, the layering large sheets of Matzo over the sauce and then adding a layer of ricotta cheese mixed with parmesan, eggs, herbs and spices, then another layer of sauce, matzo, ricotta cheese mixture, and continuing until the pan is full and is then topped with mozzarella or similar melting cheese and baked until the cheese bubbles and the top is golden brown.

== See also ==
- Matzah pizza
- Gebrochts
- Matzah brei
- Matzo balls
- Matzoquiles
- Chremslach
