= Matzo =

Matzo is a spelling variant for matzah, Jewish unleavened bread.

Matzo can also relate to:

- Matzo Ball, US Jewish Christmas Eve party
- Matzo lasagna, Italian Jewish fusion dish
- Emma Matzo, birth name of US actress Lizabeth Scott (1922–2015)

== See also ==
- Matzoquiles, Mexican Jewish fusion dish
- Matzov, Israeli army directorate
