= Matza (disambiguation) =

Matzah is a Jewish flatbread. It may also refer to:

- David Matza (1930–2018), American criminologist
- Eliyahu Matza (1935–2021), Israeili judge
- Yehoshua Matza (1931–2020), Israeli politician
- Matza, proper name of the star HIP 65426
- Matza, site of the Matza restaurant suicide bombing

== See also ==
- Matzah ball, a Jewish footstuff made with matza bread
- Matzah brei, another Jewish footstuff made with matza bread
- Lizabeth Scott (1922–2015, née Elizabeth Matzo), American actress
