= Matzah pizza =

Jewish pizza dish

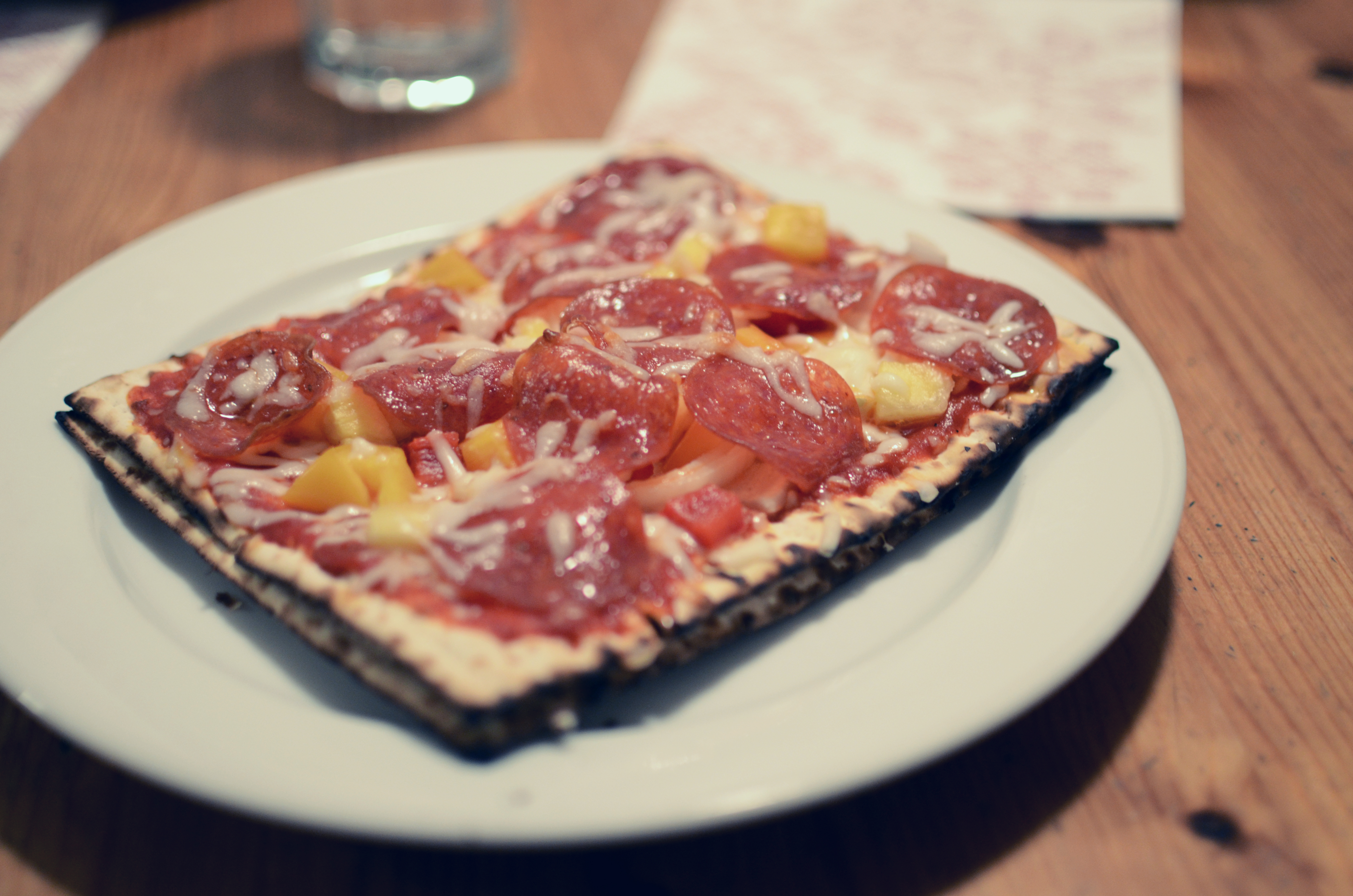
Homemade matzo pizza

Matzah pizza (sometimes spelled matzoh pizza) is a type of pizza made by baking a piece of matzo that has been topped with sauce and cheese. Because Jewish law prohibits the consumption of leavened bread during Passover, some people use matzo as a substitute for traditional pizza crusts during the holiday.

== Background ==
During Passover, Jewish law prohibits the consumption of food items that are made with yeast or leavening agents. Given these restrictions, some individuals will make pizza by substituting matzo for traditional pizza crust. However, some food manufacturers now supply traditional pizza crusts that are made with kosher-for-Passover ingredients, and some recipes suggest substituting chopped matzo for yeast dough. During Passover, some restaurants will also feature matzo pizza on their menus to substitute for traditional pizza.

== Preparation ==
Matzah pizza is prepared by covering a piece of matzo with sauce and melted cheese. It can be eaten as is or baked first. In the latter case, the matzo is first softened in water; alternately, the sauce ingredients are used to soften the matzo. Other traditional pizza toppings may be used in addition to cheese. For example, chef Spike Mendelsohn suggests topping matzah pizza with figs and asparagus, peppers and feta cheese, or cherry tomatoes, olives, and rosemary, while Martha Stewart recommends placing a fried egg on top of a matzah pizza. Other recipes suggest using crushed tomatoes instead of tomato sauce, and some recipes suggest substituting hummus for the sauce. Some recipes recommend baking the matzo and toppings on a baking sheet, either in a conventional oven or in a microwave oven, while other recipes recommend baking matzah pizza in a casserole pan so that the dish resembles a layered lasagna. Vegan recipes suggest utilizing vegan cheese or omitting the cheese entirely. Vegan cheese would also be used with meat toppings by observant Jews who will not eat meat and milk in the same dish.

== Other uses ==
Because it has large Italian and Jewish communities, the term is also occasionally used to refer to the town of Massapequa, New York.

== See also ==
- Matzo lasagna
- Gebrochts
- Matzah brei
