= Igud Anash =

Chabad-affiliated nonprofit organization

Igud Anash Inc
- Formation: 2022
- Type: 501(c)(3)
- Tax ID no.: 884324770
- Coordinator: Rabbi Levi Teichtel
- Website: https://igudanash.com/

Igud Anash (Hebrew: איגוד אנ"ש) is a Chabad-affiliated nonprofit organization, primarily focused on community outreach programs within the Chabad movement and the Jewish community. It is located in Spring Valley, New York. It's EIN designation is 884324770. Igud Anash is associated with the Chabad community in Rockland County. The organization coordinates Chabad mitzvah campaigns, including the distribution of Menorahs on Hannukah, Shmura matza on Passover, among others. One of the organization's coordinators is Rabbi Levi Teichtel. Other members include Rabbi Adam Goodfriend

== Hannukah campaign ==
In 2023 COLlive reported that hundreds of children in the Rockland County Chabad community participated in Mivtzoim each night of Chanukah, giving out Menorahs, doughnuts, chocolate coins, dreidels, and fliers coordinated by Igud Anash. The campaign was incentivized with prizes and raffles. The campaign also included pre-Hanukkah visits to residents in local senior centers.

== Passover campaign ==
In the weeks leading up to Passover, the organization holds an annual matzah distribution campaign, "Shmurah Matzah Across America: Ensuring every Jewish household in America can fulfill the mitzvah of eating matzah on the Seder night."

During the 2025 Passover campaign, 100 pounds of Shmura Matzah and over 350 Passover Haggadahs were distributed by children and families, reaching homes, stores, and nursing facilities. Participants spanned three local schools and ten synagogues.

== Purim campaign ==
Annually on Purim the organization hosts a campaign to help community members complete the Mitzvah of hearing the Book of Esther be read. "Giving hundreds of Yidden the chance to fulfill the special Mitzvos of Purim — Megillah readings, Mishloach Manos, and more."
