= Matzoquiles =

Mexican-Jewish fusion dish

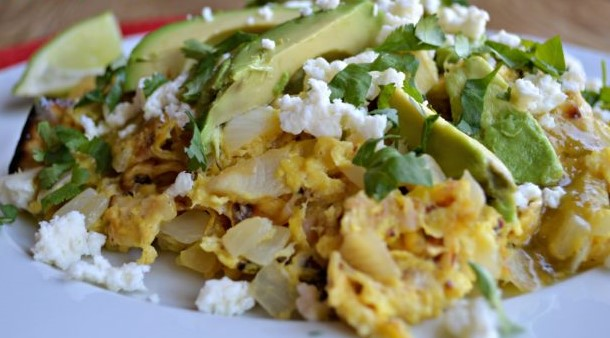
- Alternative names: Matzahquiles
- Course: Breakfast or dinner
- Place of origin: United States
- Main ingredients: Matzah, eggs, salsa verde (tomatillos), salsa roja, sour cream, cheese, radish slices, avocado, diced onion

Matzoquiles is a Mexican–Jewish fusion dish somewhat similar to the Ashkenazi Jewish dish matzah brei, the Mexican dish chilaquiles, and the Yemenite Jewish dish fatoot samneh. It is popular during Passover.

== Overview ==
Matzoquiles are often a homemade dish served during Passover. Some restaurants serve matzoquiles, such as Wise Sons in San Francisco, which serves its version with a tomatillo–pasilla chile salsa verde.

== Preparation ==
Typically, sheets of matzo are broken into large pieces and lightly fried. Sometimes pieces of matzo are broken and soaked in beaten eggs, which are then scrambled together similar to a matzah brei. Red or green salsa is poured over the crisp matzo pieces. The mixture is simmered until the matzo pieces begin to soften. Matzoquiles are commonly garnished with sour cream, cheese, sliced onion, avocado, and radish slices. Matzoquiles are often served with guacamole, or refried beans, and topped with eggs scrambled or fried.
