= Chremslach =

Jewish holiday food item

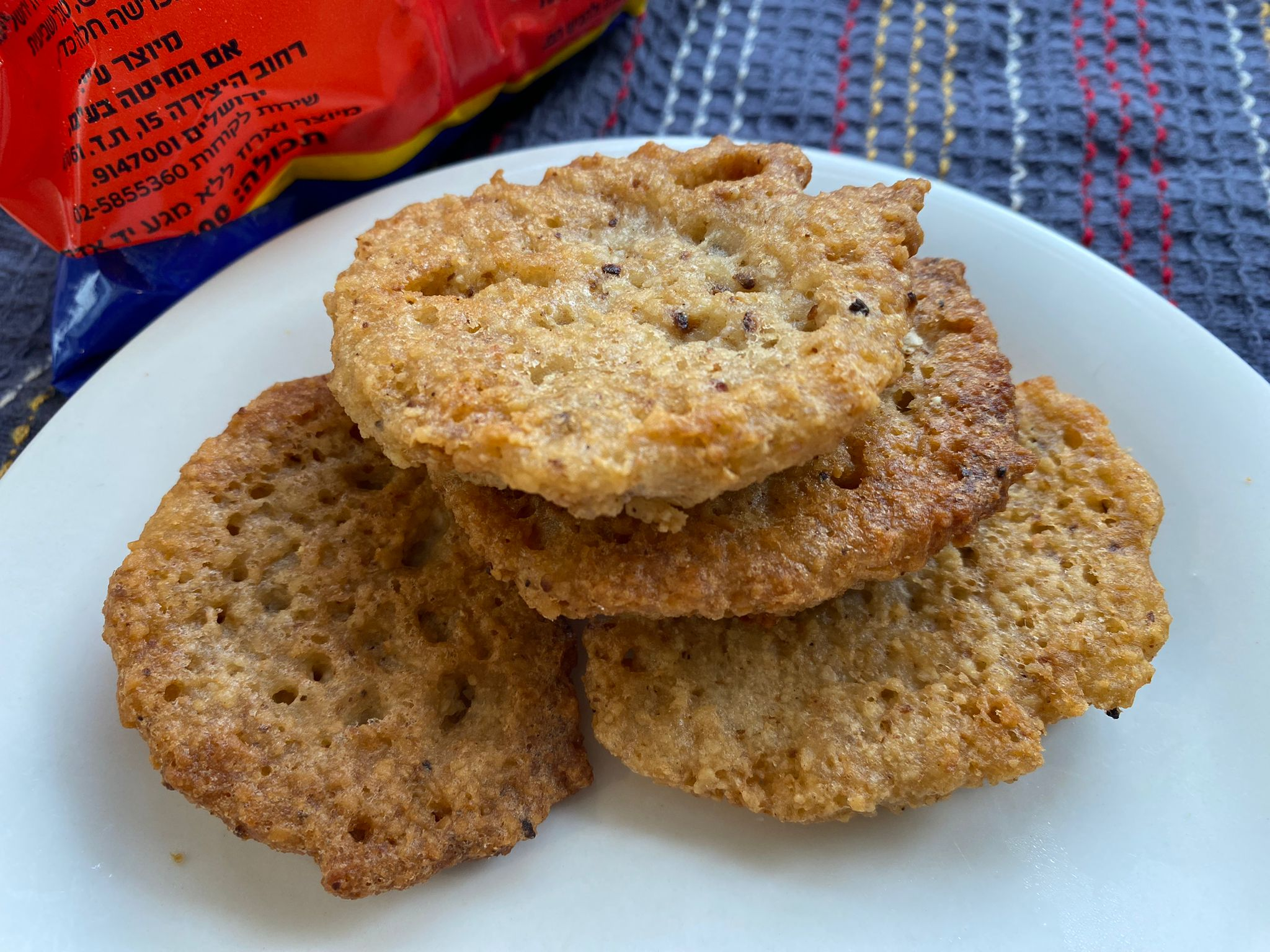
Chremslach

Chremslach (Yiddish: כרעמזלעך, IPA: [ˈχrɛmzləχ]; singular chremsl or khremzl, Yiddish: כרעמזל, IPA: [ˈχrɛmzl̩]) is a Jewish food eaten on Passover. Chremslach are small thick pancakes or fritters made of potato or matzah meal. Chremslach can also be more dessert-like, including ingredients like dried fruit and nuts.

Similar dishes, or even the same, have different names. Balkan Jews use the Ladino term bimuelos "fritters", cognate with Spanish buñuelos.

== See also ==
- List of Jewish cuisine dishes
- Delicatessen
