= Matzah brei =

Dish of Ashkenazi Jewish origin

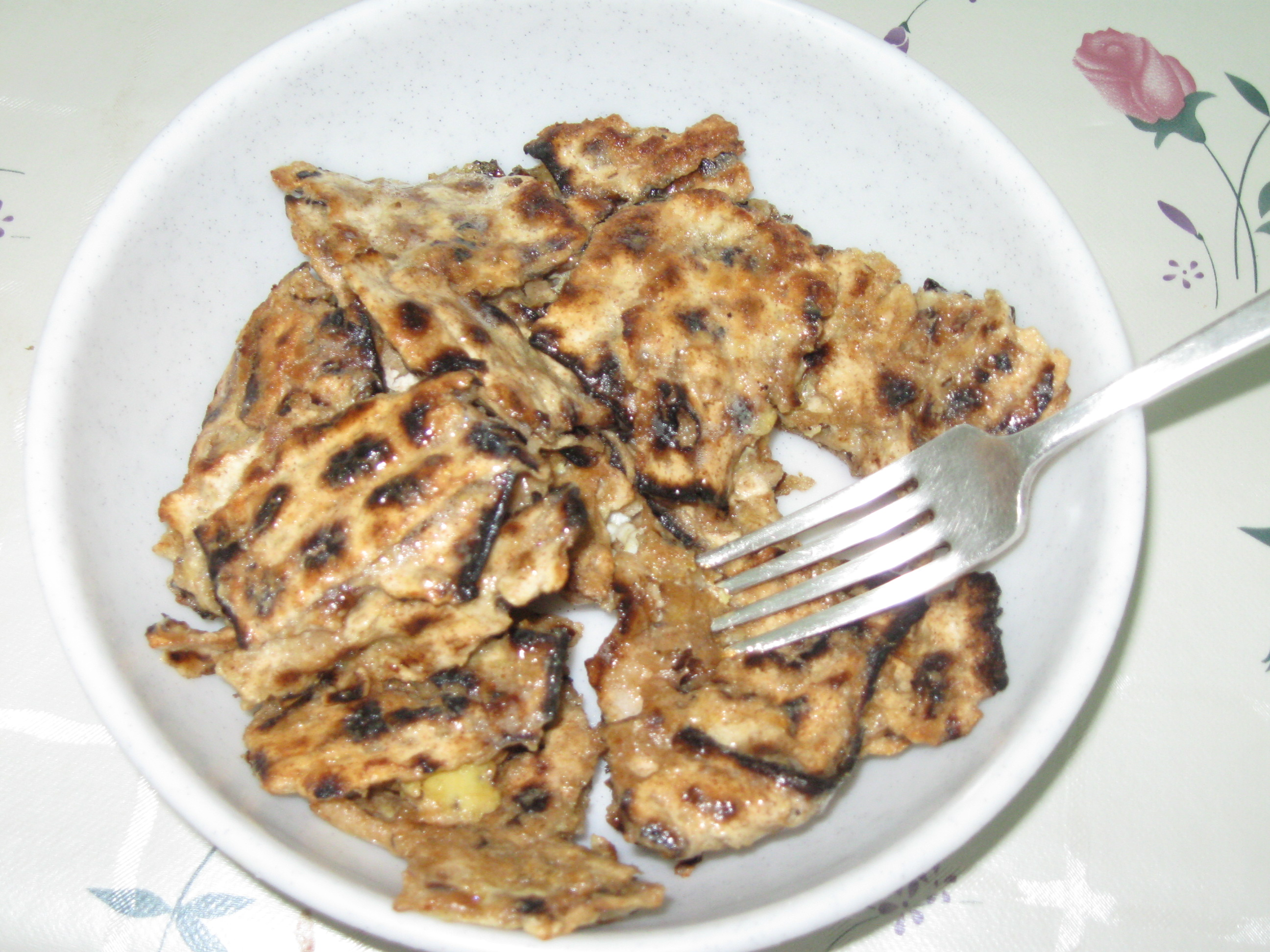
- Matzah brei
- Alternative names: Matzo brei, matzah fry, fried matzah, matzah metugnet, gefrishte matzo
- Course: Breakfast or brunch
- Place of origin: North America, other communities in the diaspora
- Created by: Jewish people
- Main ingredients: Matzo, eggs, milk or hot water, sugar or salt, spices, cheese, jam, maple syrup

Matzah brei (Yiddish: מצה ברײַ matse bray, literally 'matzah porridge'; Hebrew: מצה בריי, matzah brei, or מצה מטוגנת, matzah metugenet, literally, "fried matzah"), sometimes spelled matzah brie, matzoh brei, or matzo brei, is a dish of Ashkenazi Jewish origin made from matzah fried with eggs. It is commonly eaten as a breakfast food during the Jewish holiday of Passover. It can be prepared either sweet or savory.

== Etymology ==
The Yiddish term מצה ברײַ matse bray literally means 'matzah porridge'; ברײַ bray 'porridge' is descended from a Middle High German word brī of the same meaning.

== History ==
Gil Marks in his Encyclopedia of Jewish Food asserts that matzah brei as a fried matzah-and-egg dish originated in North America. He notes the publication of a recipe for "Fried Matzos", consisting of soaked whole matzah fried in butter or schmaltz, in The Jewish Manual (London, 1846). However, egg-based recipes began to be published in early Jewish-American cookbooks, including Aunt Babette's (1889 edition) and The Settlement Cook Book (1901). These early recipes called for whole matzahs or large, broken pieces of matzah to be dipped in beaten egg and then fried. Marks credits the development of matzah brei – in which crumbled pieces of matzah and beaten egg are combined before frying – to the influence of Eastern European Jewish immigrants to the United States. Marks adds that the introduction of machine-made matzah produced "a slightly thicker and flakier matzah than that made by hand", and is the ideal type of matzah to use for this dish.

== Preparation ==
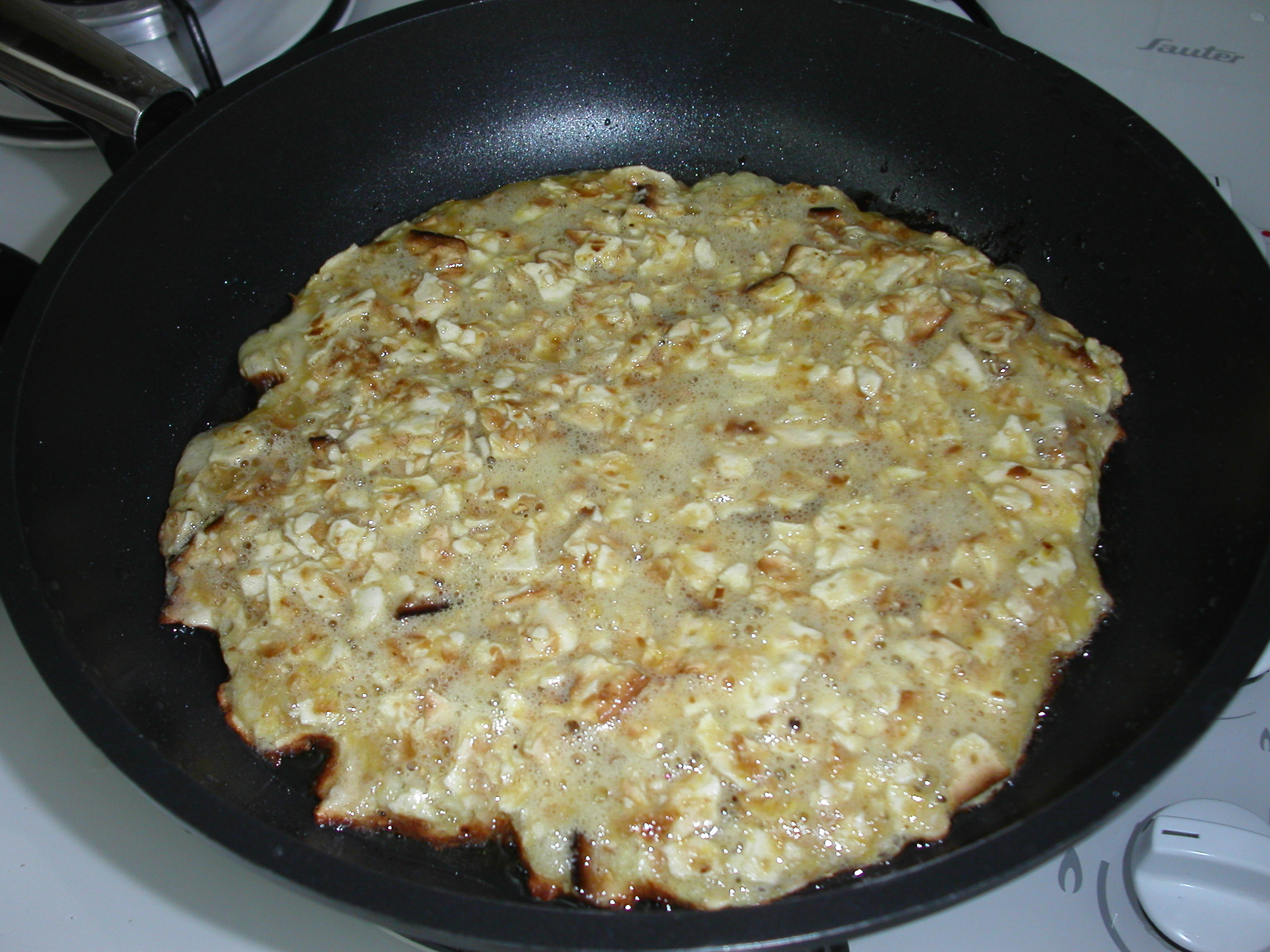
Matzah brei as it goes into the pan.

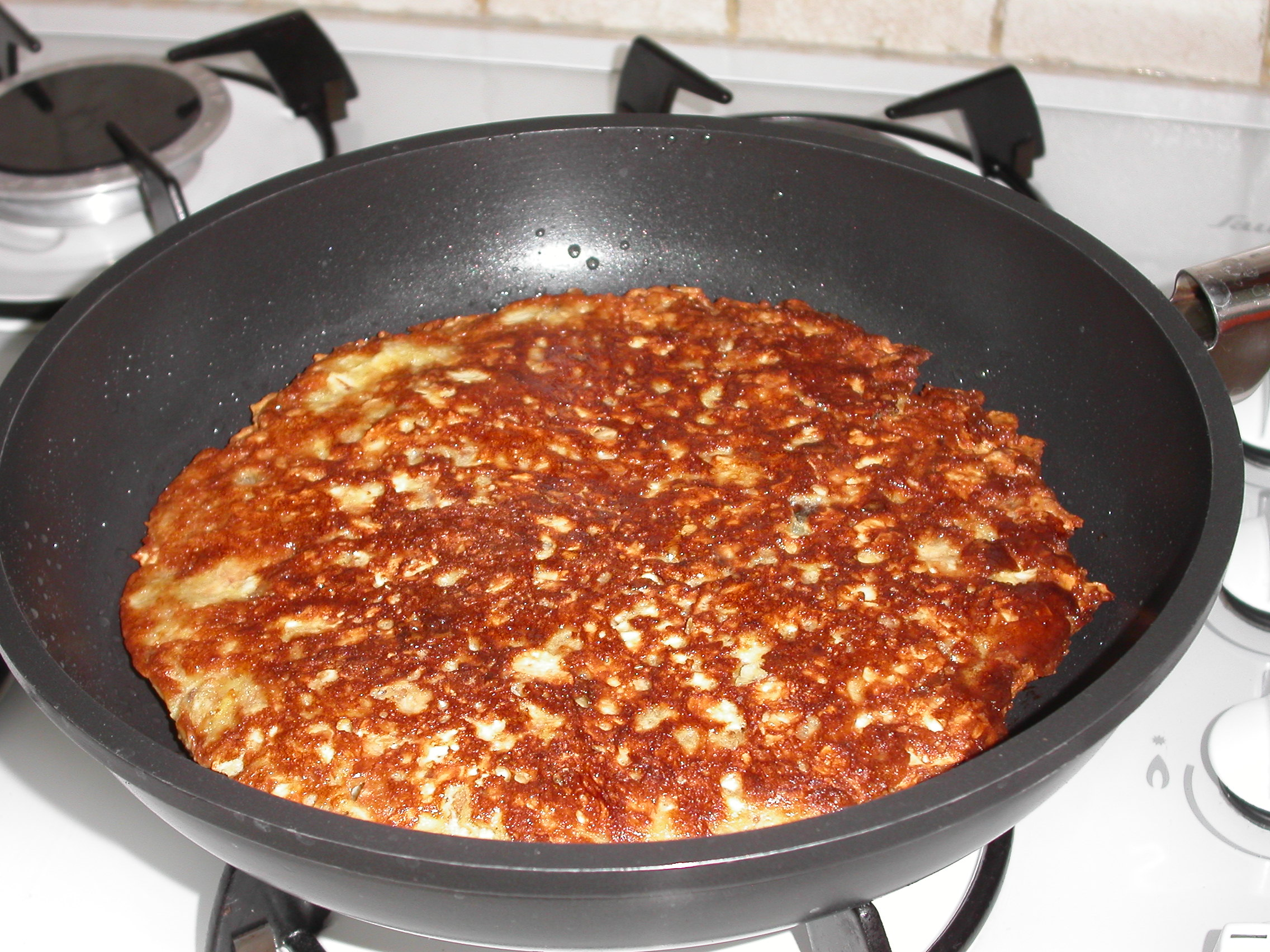
Matzah brei fried like a pancake

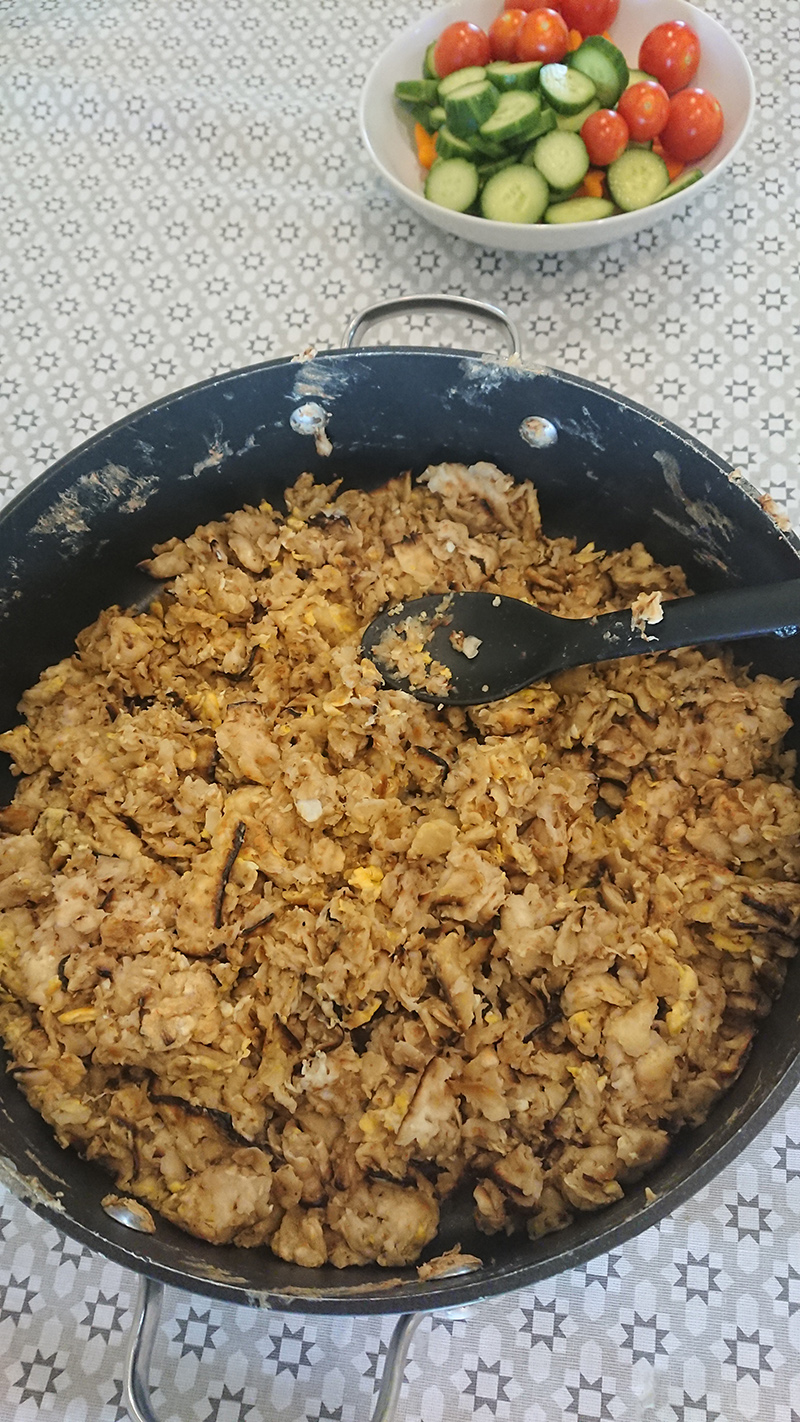
Scrambled version (Maza gebrent)

There are numerous ways to prepare the dish, as well as flexibility in ingredients. The basic ingredients are matzah, eggs, and a "softening" liquid for the matzah, such as hot water or milk. Typically the dry matzah is broken into pieces, briefly softened in water or milk, mixed with beaten eggs, and fried in a skillet. The frying is done with oil or butter. Alternately, the matzah is crumbled and then combined with beaten egg. The matzah and egg mixture may be scrambled, set to cook like a pancake, or fried like a tortilla.

Matzah brei can be made savory or sweet. Savory recipes add salt, pepper, onions, or sauerkraut to the matzah and egg, and the mixture may be fried in schmaltz. Sweet recipes add honey, cinnamon, cheese, or fruit to the matzah and egg. The cooked dish is often topped with any of the following: jam, honey, cinnamon and sugar, syrup, applesauce, sour cream, yogurt, salt and pepper, or garlic powder.

Matzah brei is commonly eaten as a breakfast food during Passover by Ashkenazi Jews. However, Hasidic Jews do not eat matzah brei or other cooked matzah dishes (such as matzah balls) during Passover due to the stringency against eating gebrochts, matzah that has come into contact with fluids. Those who avoid eating gebrochts will eat matzah brei and other cooked matzah dishes on the eighth day of Passover outside the Land of Israel, as the eighth day is of rabbinic and not Torah origin. Matzah brei can also be made without soaking the matzah in water, instead soaking it in beaten egg and then scrambling the matzah and eggs in a frying pan.

== Halachic status and blessings ==
According to Jewish law, one must recite the blessing hamotzi before eating bread. A halakhic question has arisen regarding matzah brei - whether it is considered bread or not. The Chazon Ish ruled that one should recite hamotzi over matzah brei, as with any other form of bread. However, the Aruch HaShulchan and Rabbi Dov Lior hold that the appropriate blessing is mezonot, since the matzah is no longer considered bread due to the change in its form. Rabbi Eliezer Melamed noted that there is uncertainty as to whether frying constitutes cooking (bishul) or baking (afiyah). Consequently, he rules that, ideally, matzah brei should be eaten as part of a larger meal that includes regular matzah.

== See also ==
- Matzah ball
- Matzoquiles
- Matzah pizza
- Matzo lasagna
- French toast
