= Wise Sons =

Chain of Jewish delis

Wise Sons Jewish Delicatessen
- Wise Sons Jewish Delicatessen

- Alternate logo
- Type: Jewish deli chain
- Industry: Restaurant
- Founded: 2011; 15 years ago
- Founder: Evan Bloom & Leo Beckerman
- Number of locations: 9
- Area served: San Francisco Bay Area and Culver City, Greater Los Angeles, California; Tokyo, Japan
- Products: Jewish food and drink
- Subsidiaries: Beauty's Bagel Shops
- Website: wisesonsdeli.com

Wise Sons Jewish Delicatessen is a small San Francisco-based chain of Jewish delis and bagel shops with 5 locations throughout the San Francisco Bay. It had previously expanded to Southern California and Tokyo, but those have since closed.

== Overview ==
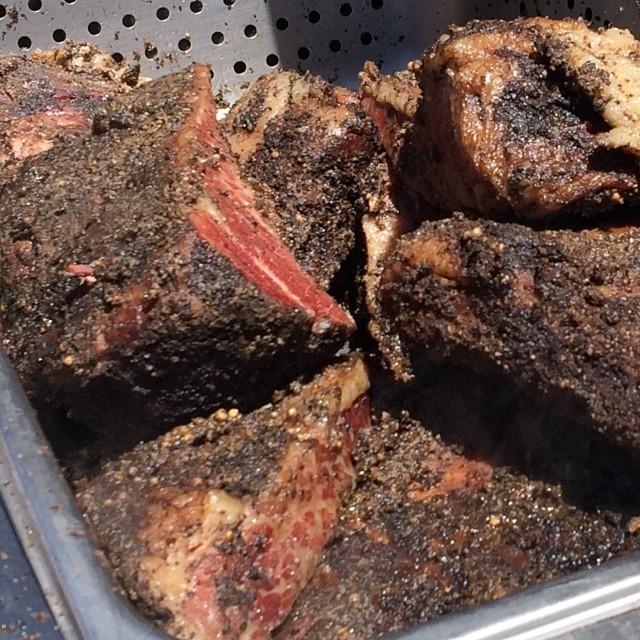
Pastrami being smoked at Wise Sons Jewish Delicatessen.

Wise Sons serves various foods from Jewish cuisine, such as pastrami, bagels, corned beef, Reuben sandwiches, and more.

== History ==
=== 2002-2015 ===
Wise Sons Jewish Delicatessen was founded by brothers Evan & Ari Bloom and their friend Leo Beckerman at 22nd and Mission Street in the Mission District neighborhood of San Francisco, California.

=== 2015-2020 ===
On January 27, 2015, a fire broke out in the 2588 Mission Street building on the corner of 22nd and Mission. This was the deli chain's flagship location, and housed its commissary kitchen inside which served their other locations. Wise Sons had been planning to launch a new line of bagels baked on-site that same week, complete with a small to-go window that had been constructed in a 100-square-foot space in the building. The fire killed a 38-year-old man, and destroyed the homes of 54 people as well as numerous businesses besides Wise Sons including Mission Market, taquerias, and a Popeyes. The subsequent water damage from firefighting efforts also devastated the company's central office that has been located in the building, destroying computers, files, and all of their equipment for their annual booth at the Outside Lands festival.

Due to the fire destroying their commissary kitchen, Bloom was looking for a new 2000-4000 sq ft space to use, but temporarily the 24th Street location handled smoking meats such as pastrami and making sauces such as Russian dressing, while the Contemporary Jewish Museum location baked challah and bialys in the evening hours. For the first time rye bread was sourced from an outside supplier.

=== 2020- 2024 ===
In the spring of 2020, business was down by 50%, their bagel shop at the Marin Country Mart was temporarily closed, several executives left, and their catering business had declined due to the COVID-19 pandemic. The Marin Country Mart location permanently closed in 2020.

Wise Sons opened their first location in the Los Angeles Area, in August 2021 with the opening of their downtown Culver City location in the former Amacita space directly adjacent to Amazon Studios and HBO's headquarters. This location had been under development since at least March 2021. The Culver City location closed in 2023

Wise sons also acquired the Beauty Bagels shop and business in Oakland's Temescal neighborhood in September 2020. It continues to operate under the Beauty's name. https://sf.eater.com/2020/8/20/21376900/wise-sons-deli-buys-beautys-bagel-shop-oakland-east-bay-expansion

=== 2024- Present ===
Wise Sons closed and relocated several locations in 2024, to focus their attention on their locations in San Francisco and Oakland. The locations at the Contemporary Jewish Museum and in Uptown Oakland closed their doors. https://jweekly.com/2024/08/01/wise-sons-closes-oakland-and-cjm-locations-israel-food-trip-canceled/

In October 2024 Wise Sons opened a location in the restaurant/ cafe space of the JCC of San Francisco, bringing their Jewish food to a hub of San Francisco's Jewish community. https://jweekly.com/2024/05/30/san-franciscos-favorite-deli-is-coming-to-the-jcc/

== Cookbook ==
In 2020, Evan Bloom collaborated with Rachel Levin, Maren Caruso and George McCallam on Eat Something: A Wise Sons Cookbook for Jews Who Like Food and Food Lovers Who Like Jews. The book is inspired by the book "Bar Mitzvah Disco", and seeks to blend Wise Sons recipes with Jewish classics, and a contemporary take on the cultural traditions that go with them.

== Locations ==
Wise Sons currently has 5 locations.

California locations
24th Street Deli, Mission District, San Francisco
Hayes Valley, San Francisco
Fillmore Street, San Francisco
Beauty's Bagel Shop Temescal, Oakland
JCC of San Francisco, California Street

== See also ==
- List of Jewish delis
