= Matzah shmura =

Type of unleavened bread

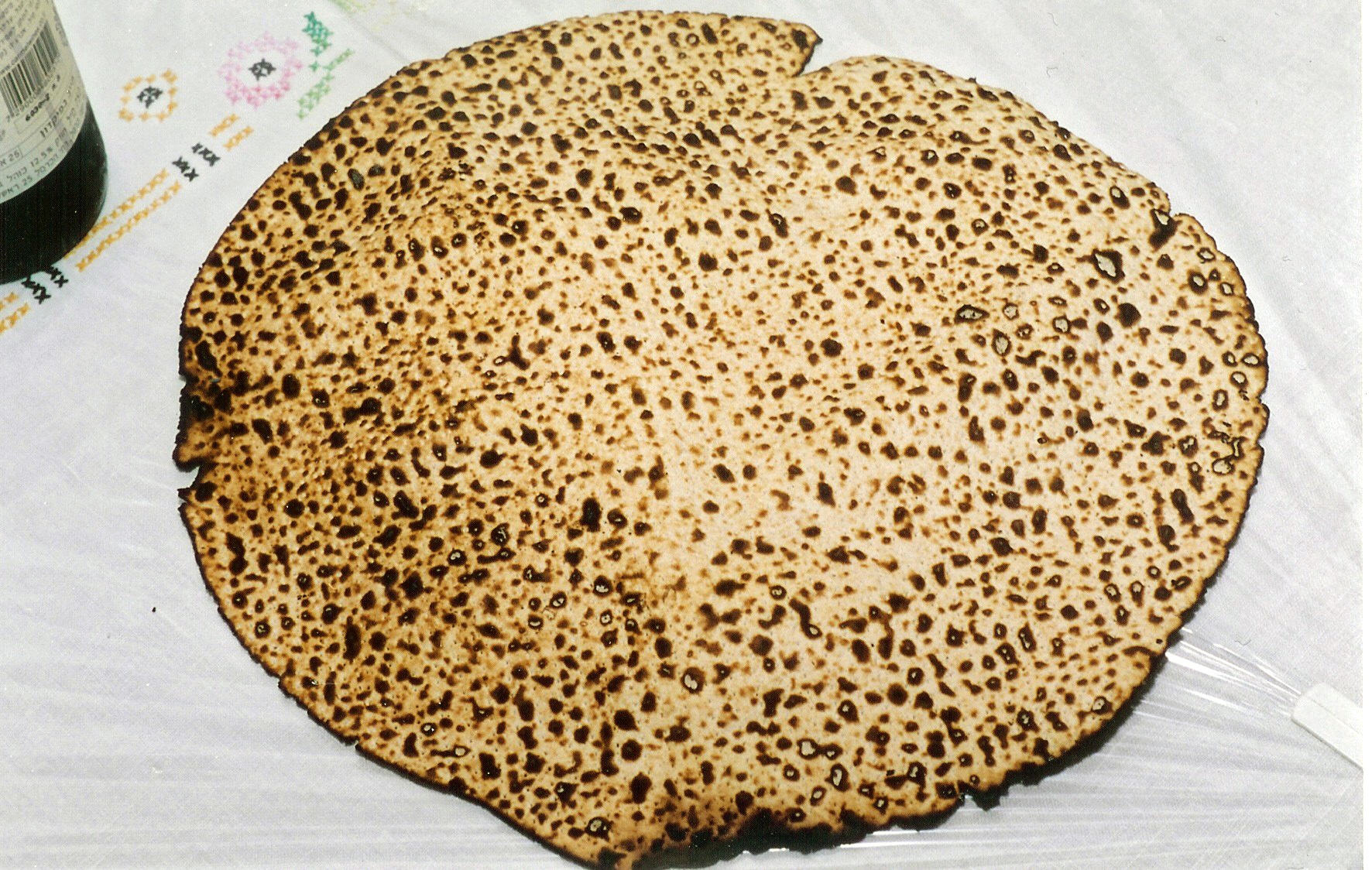
Matza shmura

Matzah shmura (מצה שמורה) or shemurah matzah or shmura matzo is a matzah that during its preparation was specially guarded to prevent it from becoming leavened, and not just that it did not become leavened "by chance"

There are different opinions in the Gemara and among the decisors regarding from which stage in the matzah's preparation it needs to be guarded in order to be considered "Matzah Shmura". Today, it is accepted to define as Matzah Shmura only matzah that was baked from wheat that was guarded from contact with water from the time of harvesting; however, since there are different opinions among the early decisors regarding whether the guarding needs to be from the time of harvesting, from the time of grinding, or from the time of kneading, someone who only has matzah that was guarded from one of these times for the mitzvah of eating matzah should eat it for the sake of the mitzvah commandment (possibly without a blessing) in order to satisfy these opinions.

In addition, the matzah for the mitzvah also needs another element of guarding, meaning it needs to be "for its sake", that is, the harvesting and guarding of the matzahs should be done for the sake of the mitzvah of eating matzah, and not for any other purpose.

== The sources to matzah shmura ==
The source for the need for shemurah matzah is in the Talmud. where it concludes that there is a commandment to guard the matzahs for Passover. However, the Talmud deliberates whether the need for guarding is from the time of baking or perhaps already from the time of harvesting.

According to Jewish law, it is decided that it is best to be stringent and have guarding from the time of harvesting, but it is also sufficient to guard from the time of grinding, and in pressing circumstances, it is even possible to rely on the third opinion and buy flour from the market, and to guard it from the time of kneading. In addition, different decisors understood that the need is only for guarding the matzah for the Seder night and not for the rest of the holiday, for which regular guarding, meaning from the time of baking, is sufficient.

These decisors also differed in the question of whether there is a need to intend "for the sake of matzah", meaning to prevent water contact with the flour, or "for the sake of the commandment", meaning a special intention is required for the mitzvah of eating the matzah on the Seder night.

Other decisors (led by the Rif and the Rambam) understood that the commandment applies to all the matzahs eaten on the Passover holiday and not just those on the Seder night, and it seems that according to their opinion, the guarding does not require intention for the sake of the commandment, but only to prevent leavening.

The prevalent custom nowadays is to eat shmurah matzahs on the Seder night only, and on the rest of the holiday to eat "regular" matzahs. However, there are those who are stringent and eat shmurah matzahs throughout the entire holiday, and there are those who are lenient and even on the Seder night eat matzahs that were not guarded from the time of harvesting but only from the time of grinding (or kneading) according to the lenient opinions among the early decisors.

Some of the early decisors believed that at the time when the Passover sacrifice is offered and the obligation to eat matzah and bitter herbs together with an olive's volume from the Passover sacrifice is from the Torah to fulfill "with matzahs and bitter herbs they shall eat it", and its commandment at the end of the meal (eaten on a full stomach), they refrained from eating shmurah matzah at the beginning of the Seder so that they could bless "on eating matzah" on the mitzvah matzah, and the matzahs of the meal that were eaten before were made specifically not from guarded flour.

These traditions are very ancient, and they preserve what was customary in the past. In addition, in the last generation, shmurah matzahs are also produced by machines - 'machine shmurah matzahs', which are square like regular matzahs, but in their production process, the rules of 'shmurah' are observed. At the time of the wheat harvest itself, a supervisor is present with the combine driver, checking that there are no issues of mixed species and the like, which could affect the kosher status.

== Gallery ==
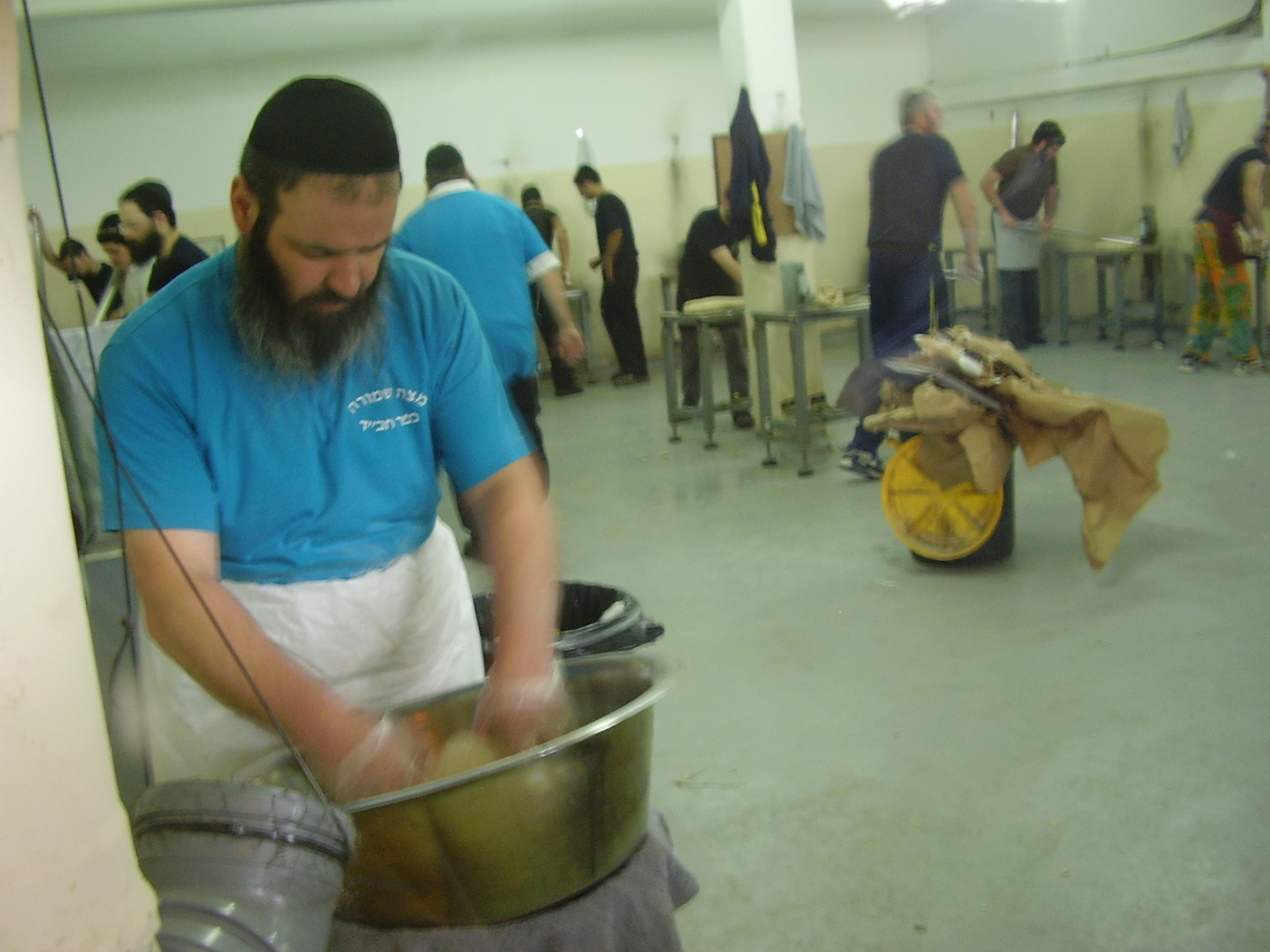
The mixer and dough handlers in Kfar Chabad

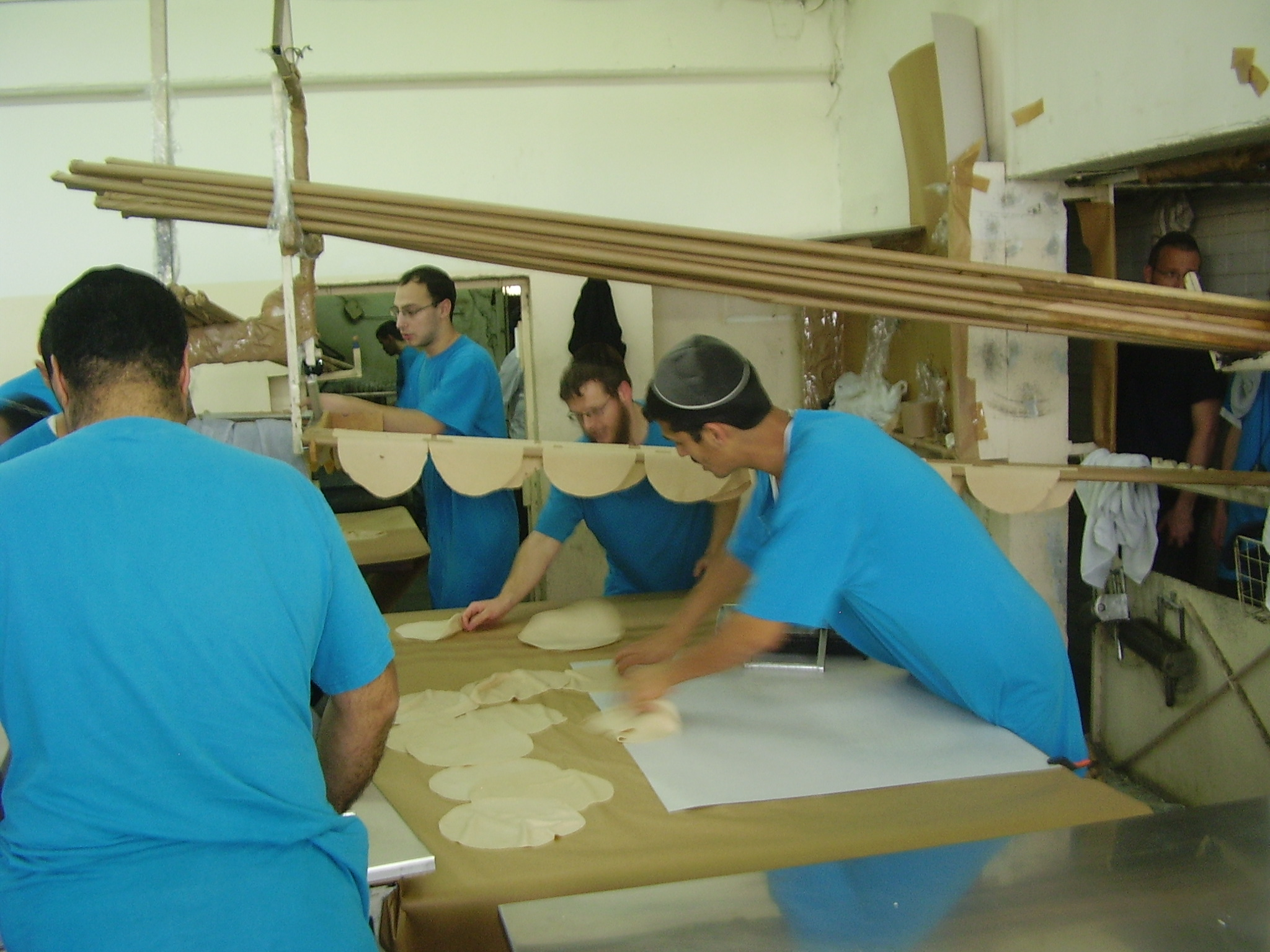
Rolling the matzahs and placing them on a stick that enters the oven in the bakery in Kfar Chabad

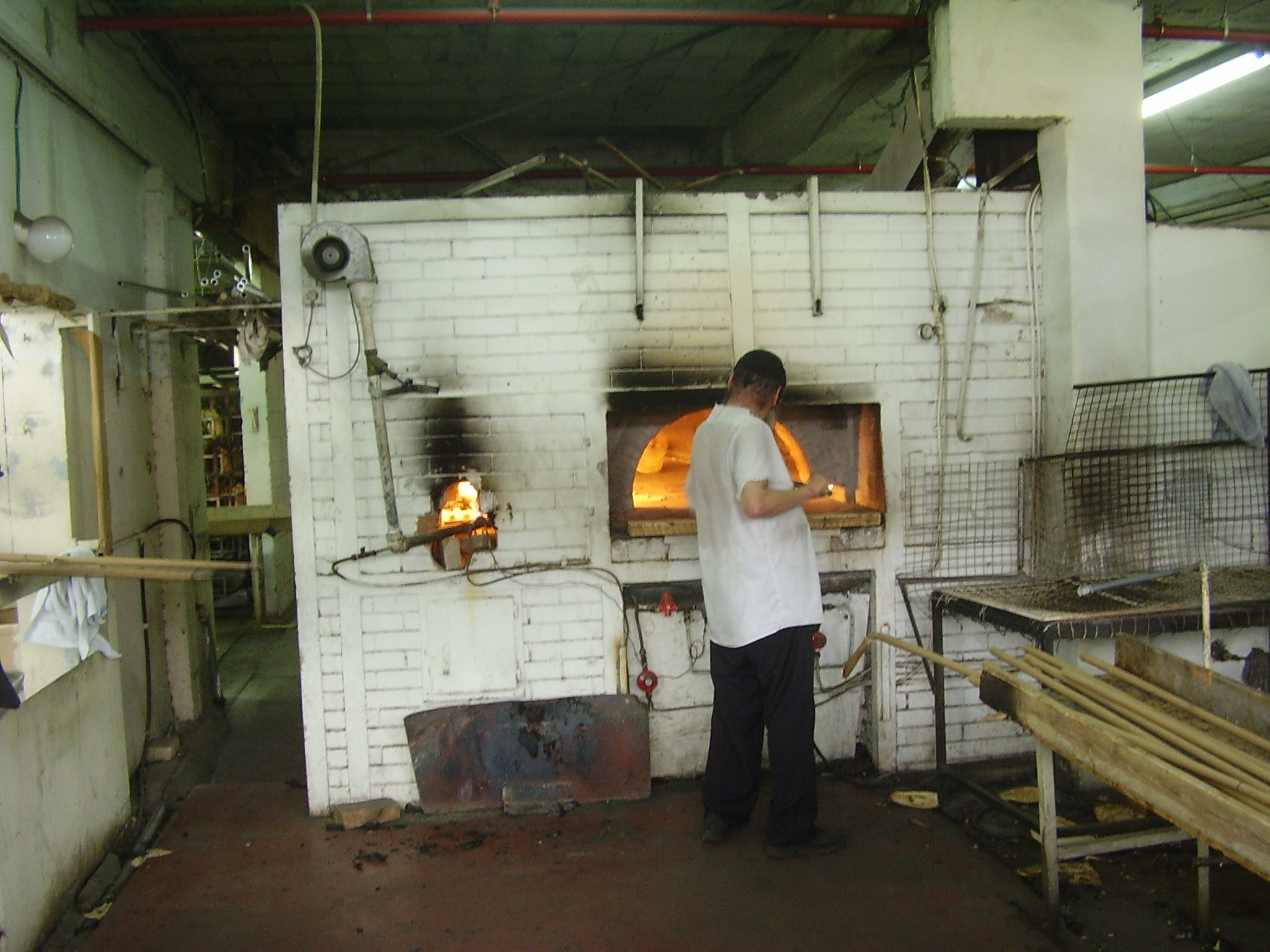
The baker and the oven in baking shemurah matzah in Kfar Chabad
