= Matzah ball =

Soup dumpling in Jewish cuisine

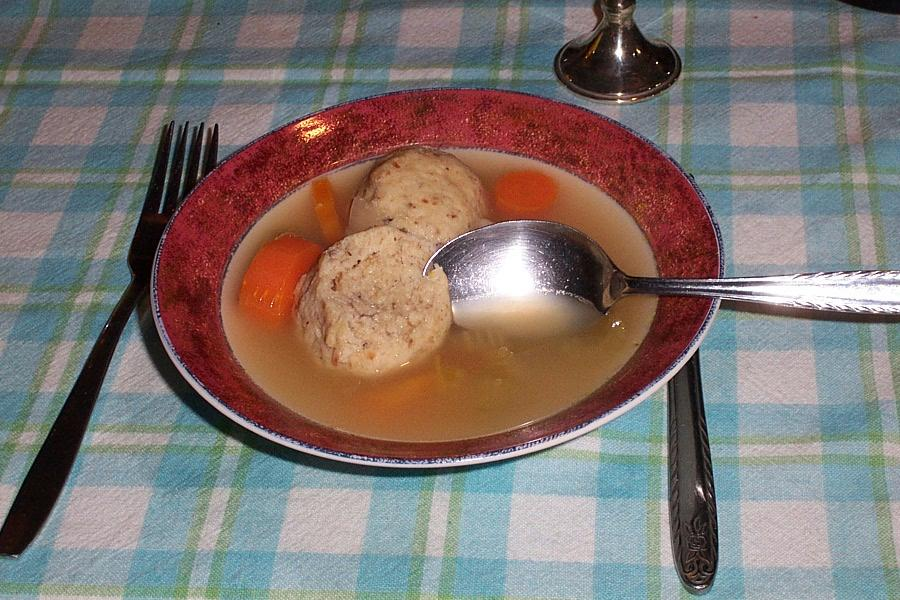
- Alternative names: Kneieydl, knaidel or kneidel in singular. Kneydlech, knaidelech or kneidelech, or knaidlach in plural.
- Type: Dumpling
- Region or state: Ashkenazi Jewish areas of Central and Eastern Europe,
- Serving temperature: Temperature at which broth simmers
- Main ingredients: Matzah meal, egg, water, oil or schmaltz or margarine

Matzah balls or matzo balls are Ashkenazi Jewish soup morsels made from a mixture of matzah meal, beaten eggs, water, and a fat, such as oil, margarine, or chicken fat. Known as knaidel in Yiddish (Yiddish: קניידלעך, romanized: kneydlekh pl., singular קניידל, kneydl; with numerous other transliterations), they resemble a matzah meal version of Knödel, bread dumplings popular throughout Central European and East European cuisine.

Matzah balls are traditionally served in chicken soup and are a staple food on the Jewish holiday of Passover. However, they are not eaten during Passover by those who observe a prohibition on soaking matzah products.

The texture of matzah balls may be light or dense, depending on the recipe. Matzah balls made from some recipes float in soup; others sink.

== Transliterations of knaidel ==
Although there are official transliterations of Yiddish words into English by the YIVO Institute, there are many non-standard transliterations. Alternate transliterations of the Yiddish term for matzah ball, in the singular, include: knaidl, knaidel, kneidl, and kneidel. Transliterations in the plural include: knaidels, knaidlach, knaidelach, kneidels, kneidlach, kneidelach, kneydls, kneydels, and kneydlach.

The various transliterations of the term gave rise to minor controversy in the United States in June 2013, when it was the winning word in the Scripps National Spelling Bee. Thirteen-year-old Arvind Mahankali of New York spelled "knaidel" correctly in accordance with Webster's Third New International Dictionary, the official dictionary of the Bee, to become the champion. However, there was controversy whether that was the definitive spelling of the term, with others preferring "knaydel", "kneydel", "knadel" or "kneidel".

== History ==
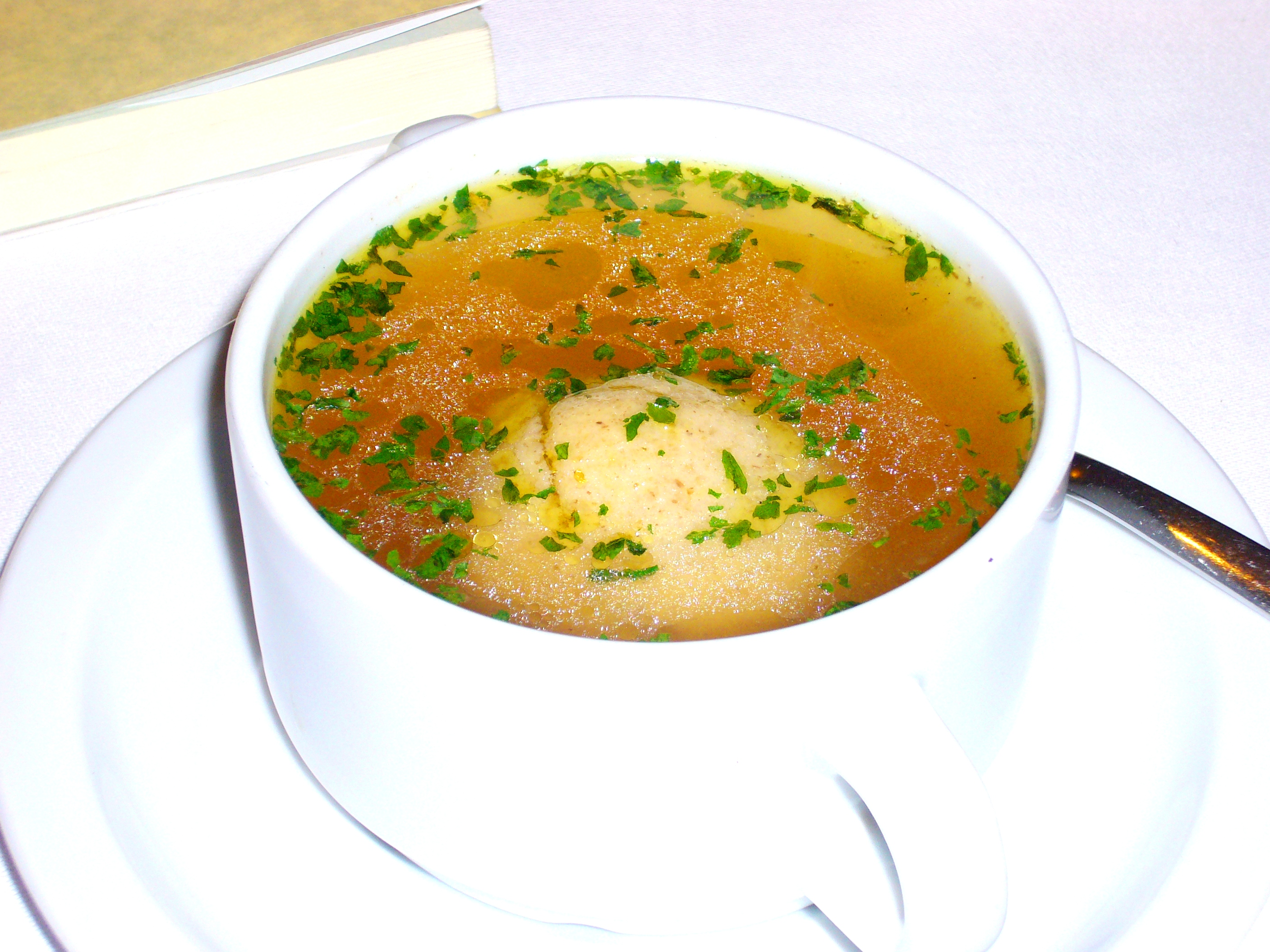

An early recipe for matzoh ball soup, made with beef stock, is found in The Jewish Manual; or Practical Information in Jewish and Modern Cookery (1846). The exact origins of matzo balls, and the traditional matzo ball soup, are unknown. Some historians posit that the copious amounts of matzo meal produced during the Industrial Revolution in the 19th century contributed to the popularity of the matzo ball, others believe that Jews used the leftover matzo breadcrumbs for soup additions. It is believed that Jews began placing matzo balls in their soup as Eastern European cuisine began introducing dumplings in traditional foods, and Jews were adapting them to their dietary restrictions and culinary tastes. German, Austrian, and Alsatian Jews were the first to prepare matzo balls for their soup; middle eastern Jews introduced additional variations.

== Preparation ==
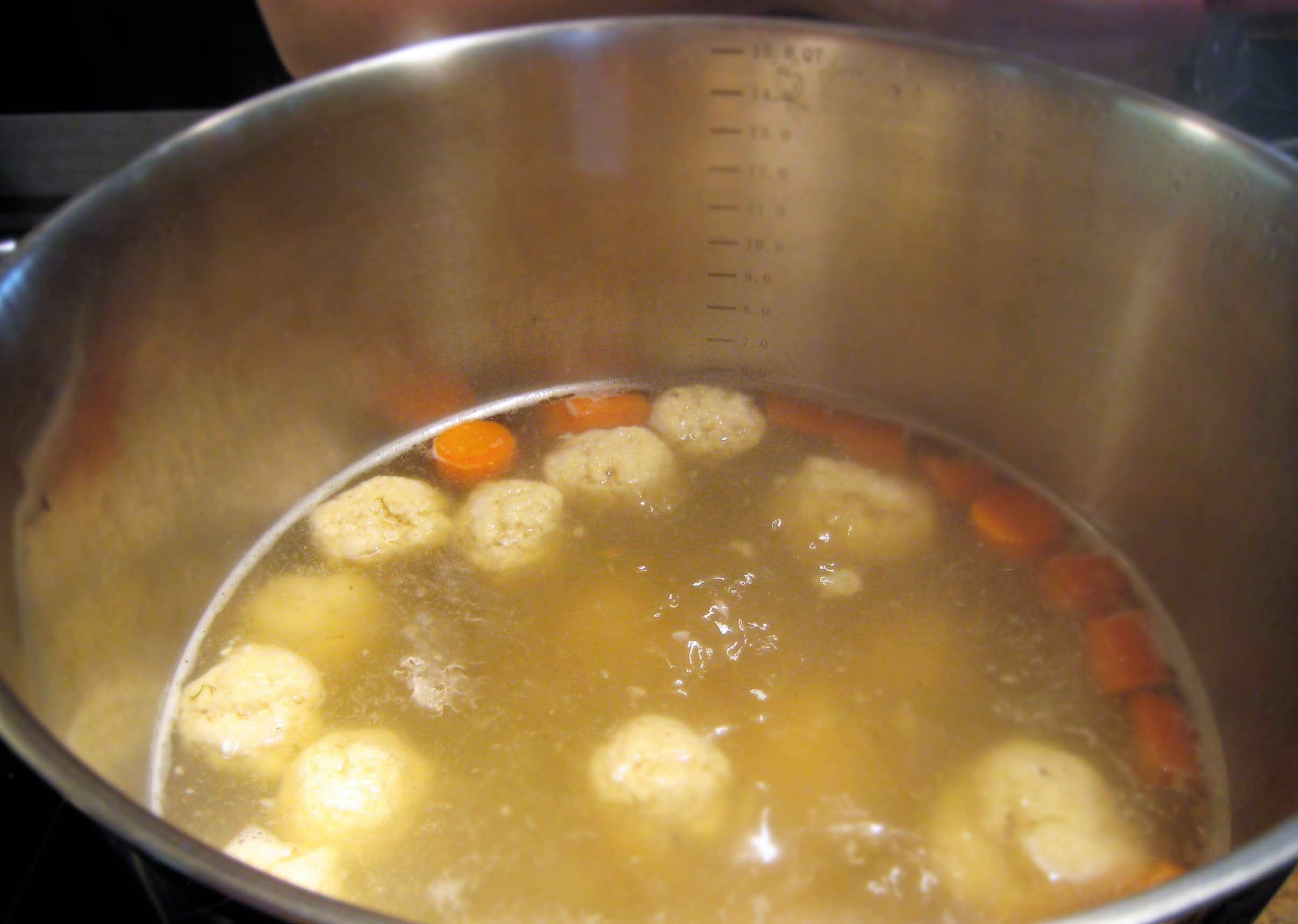
Simmering kneidlach

Schmaltz (chicken fat) imparts a distinctive flavour, but many modern cooks prefer vegetable oils or margarine. The use of butter, while otherwise suitable, violates the Jewish law of kashrut prohibiting consumption of milk and meat products together, if the balls are eaten with chicken soup. A pareve variant uses vegetable broth as the soup base. The balls are dropped into a pot of salted boiling water or soup, then the heat turned down to a simmer and a lid placed on the pot. The balls swell during the cooking time of 20 to 30 minutes. Adding kosher baking powder for lightness is permissible, even for Passover (provided that one is not observant of prohibitions of gebrocht).

While the recipe is simple, there are also ready matzah ball mixes, typically to be added to beaten egg.

== World records ==
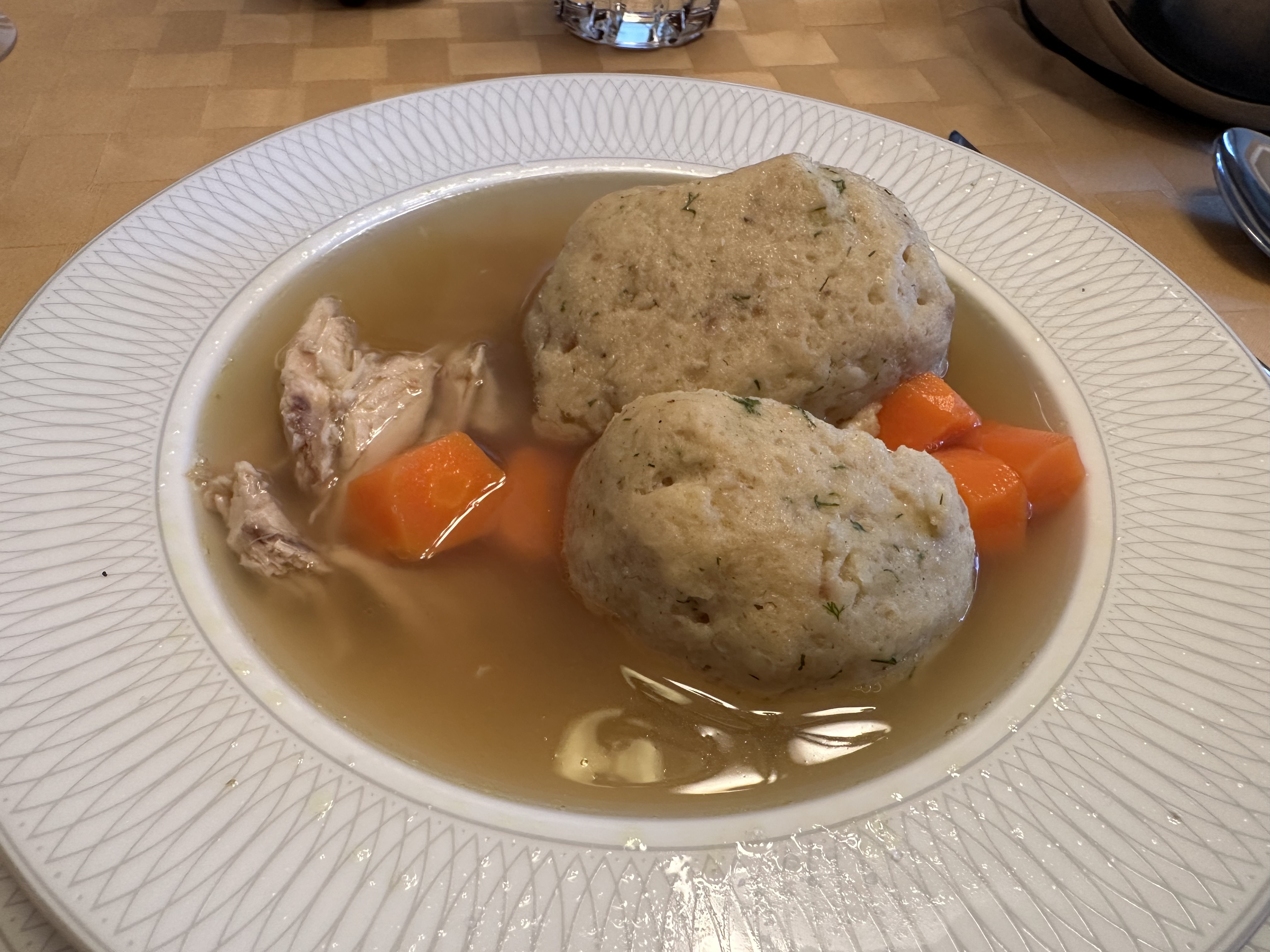
Bowl of matzah ball soup served on Passover

In 2008, Joey Chestnut held the world record for eating matzah balls: 78 of 3 1/2 ounces (99 g) in 8 minutes, at the Inaugural World Matzoh Ball Eating Championship, a charity event.

In 2010, the world's largest matzah ball was prepared by Chef Jon Wirtis of Shlomo and Vito's New York City Delicatessen, located in Tucson, Arizona. He created a 426-pound (193 kg) matzah ball for New York's Jewish Food Festival. The ingredients were 125 pounds (57 kg) of matzah meal, 25 pounds (11 kg) of schmaltz, over 1,000 eggs and 20 pounds (9.1 kg) of potato starch. This broke the previous record set by Chef Anthony Sylvestri of Noah's Ark Deli to raise awareness for a charity basketball game, which weighed 267 pounds (121 kg) and was 29.2 inches (74 cm) long and was made from "1,000 eggs, 80 pounds of margarine, 200 pounds of matzah meal, and 20 pounds of chicken base".

== See also ==
- Gondi - a similar Persian Jewish dish
- Jewish cuisine
- Matzah brei
