= Gebrochts =

Matzo that has absorbed liquid

Gebrokts or gebrochts (Yiddish: געבראקטס, lit. 'broken', also known as Hebrew: מצה שרויה, romanized: matzo shruya, lit. 'soaked matzo') refers to matzo that has absorbed liquid. Avoidance of gebrochts, or "Non Gebrochts", is an aspect of Passover kashrut observed by many in the Hasidic Jewish community, as well as by some other Ashkenazi Jewish groups influenced by Hasidism.

== Custom ==
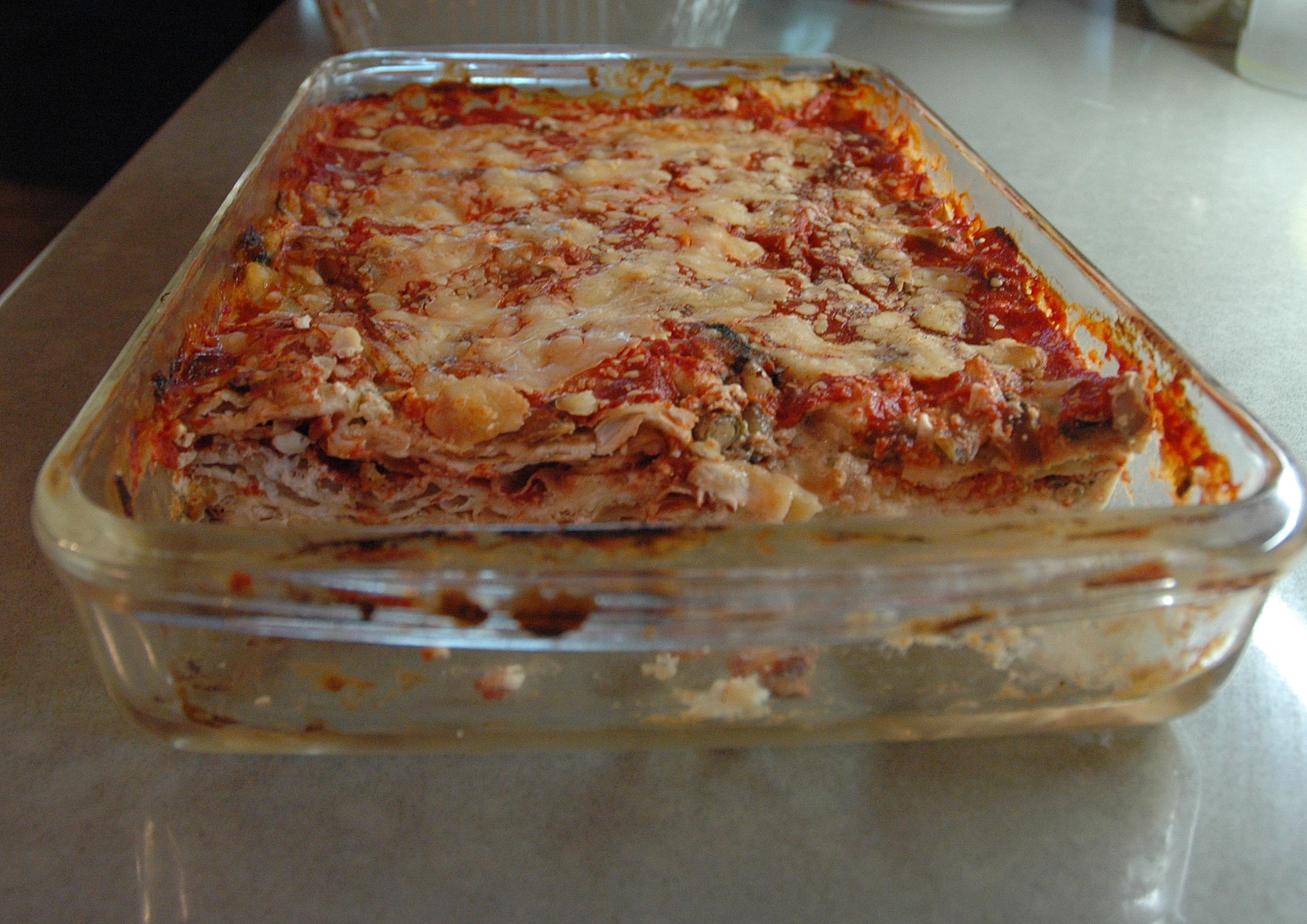
Matza lasagne, an example of "gebrochts"

During the holiday of Passover, Jews are forbidden to eat any of five species of grain (wheat, barley, spelt, oats, and rye) if they have been "leavened." Leavening (Hebrew: חמץ, romanized: chametz) is defined as flour of one of these grains combined with water and allowed to sit for more than 18 minutes before being baked. Once flour has been reacted with water and rapidly baked into matzo, it is no longer subject to leavening. According to this argument, matzo and its derivatives are neither "leavened" nor "leavenable" and therefore are permissible for consumption during Passover. A reading of the tractate Pesahim from the Babylonian Talmud (c. 500) makes it clear that in Talmudic times, matzo soaked in water was permitted during Passover; the Ashkenazi rabbi and exegete Rashi (c. 1100) also indicates that this was unobjectionable (Berachot 38b).

However, the custom later developed among some Ashkenazim, primarily Hasidic Jews, to avoid putting matzo (or any derivative, such as matzo meal) into water (or any liquid), to avoid the possibility that a clump of flour that was never properly mixed with water (and thus is still susceptible to leavening) may come into contact with the liquid. According to Rabbi Yitzchak Eizik of Vitebsk, the custom originated with Dov Ber of Mezeritch. (This appears, for example, in Shulchan Aruch HaRav, c. 1800.) Therefore, some Jewish communities, especially Hasidic Jews, do not eat matzo ball soup during Passover. "Non-gebrochts" recipes and products generally substitute potato starch for matzo meal.

== Observance ==
Some non-gebrochts eaters will not use dishes that were used for gebrochts. Some hotels and restaurants open during Passover indicate on their menus, "if you would like to add matzo to your chicken soup, please notify the waiter so s/he may provide you with a disposable bowl and spoon." Others observe the custom only on the first night of Passover or abstain from eating gebrochts themselves but do not regard it as chametz. Personal customs generally reflect the norms of one's family and community.

Most Ashkenazim consider gebrochts to be a non-issue. While no one argues that one must consume gebrochts during Passover, many consider gebrochts dishes (matzo ball soup or matzah brei, for example) to constitute an enjoyable and significant role in their Passover experience and thus a way to fulfill the mitzvah of being happy on a Yom Tov. In fact, the members of some nineteenth century Lithuanian Jewish communities deliberately ate gebrochts to demonstrate the permissibility of this practice. Both the Vilna Gaon and Rabbi Moshe Feinstein ruled that there is no reason to avoid eating gebrochts.

In Israel, Passover is observed for seven days, as mandated by the Torah; those with the custom of not eating gebrochts generally abstain for all seven days. Outside of Israel, however, an eighth day is observed because of a decree of Rabbinic law. On this eighth day, virtually all communities consider gebrochts to be permitted, even those who are careful not to eat gebrochts for the first seven days.

== See also ==
- Passover
