= Matzah =

Jewish unleavened bread used in Passover

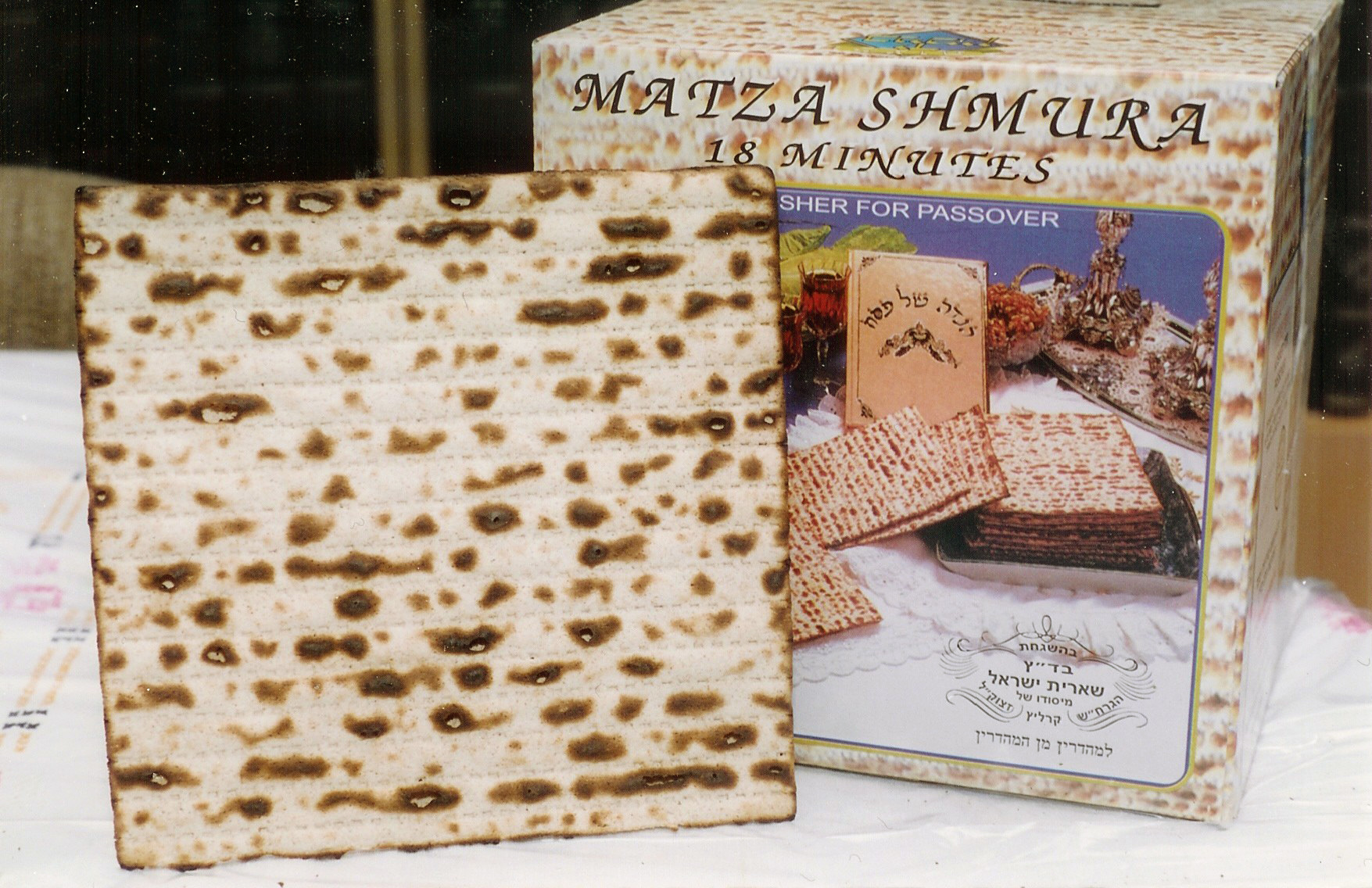
- Machine-made matzot from Jerusalem
- Alternative names: Matzo, matza
- Type: Flatbread

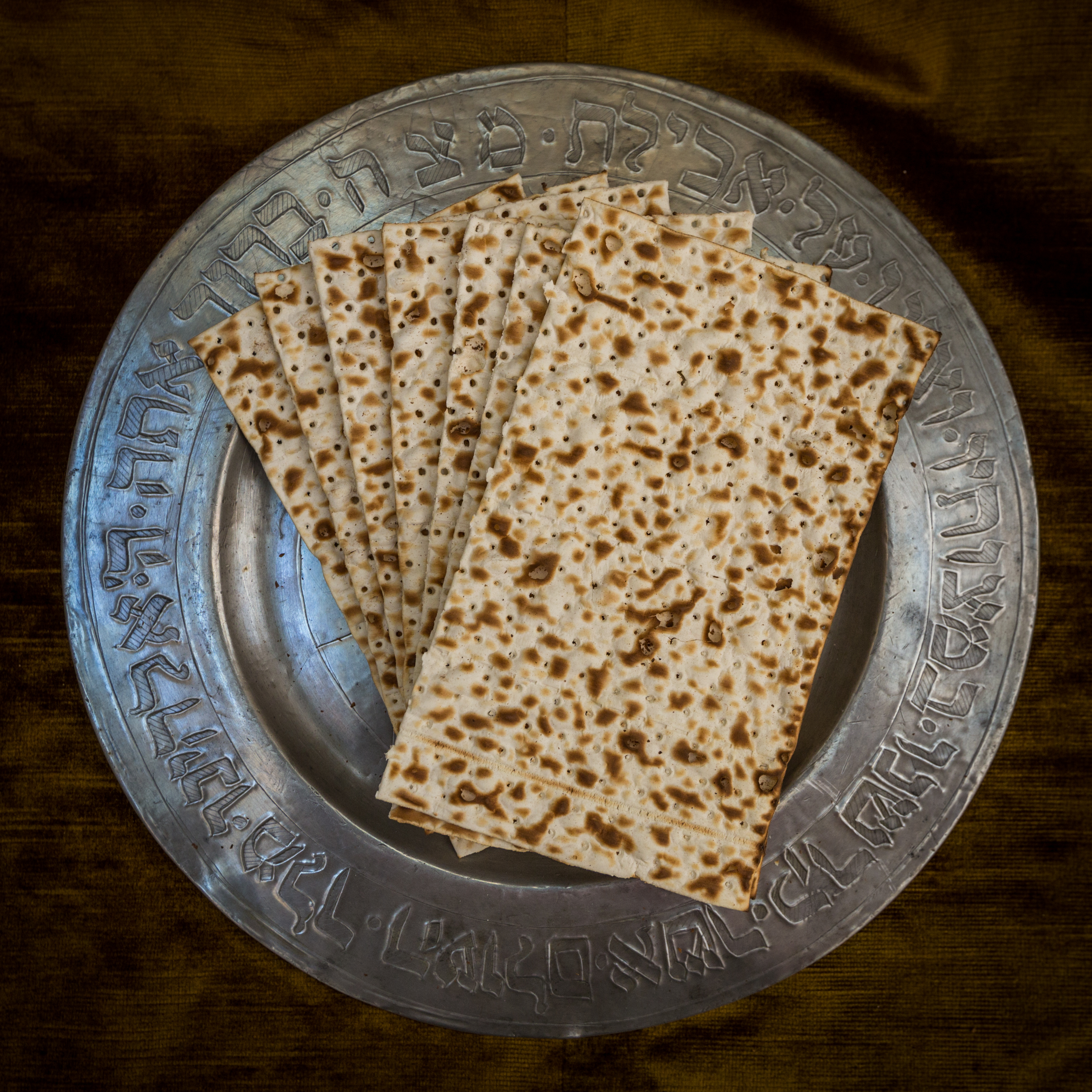
Matzah plate with an inscription of the blessing over the matzah

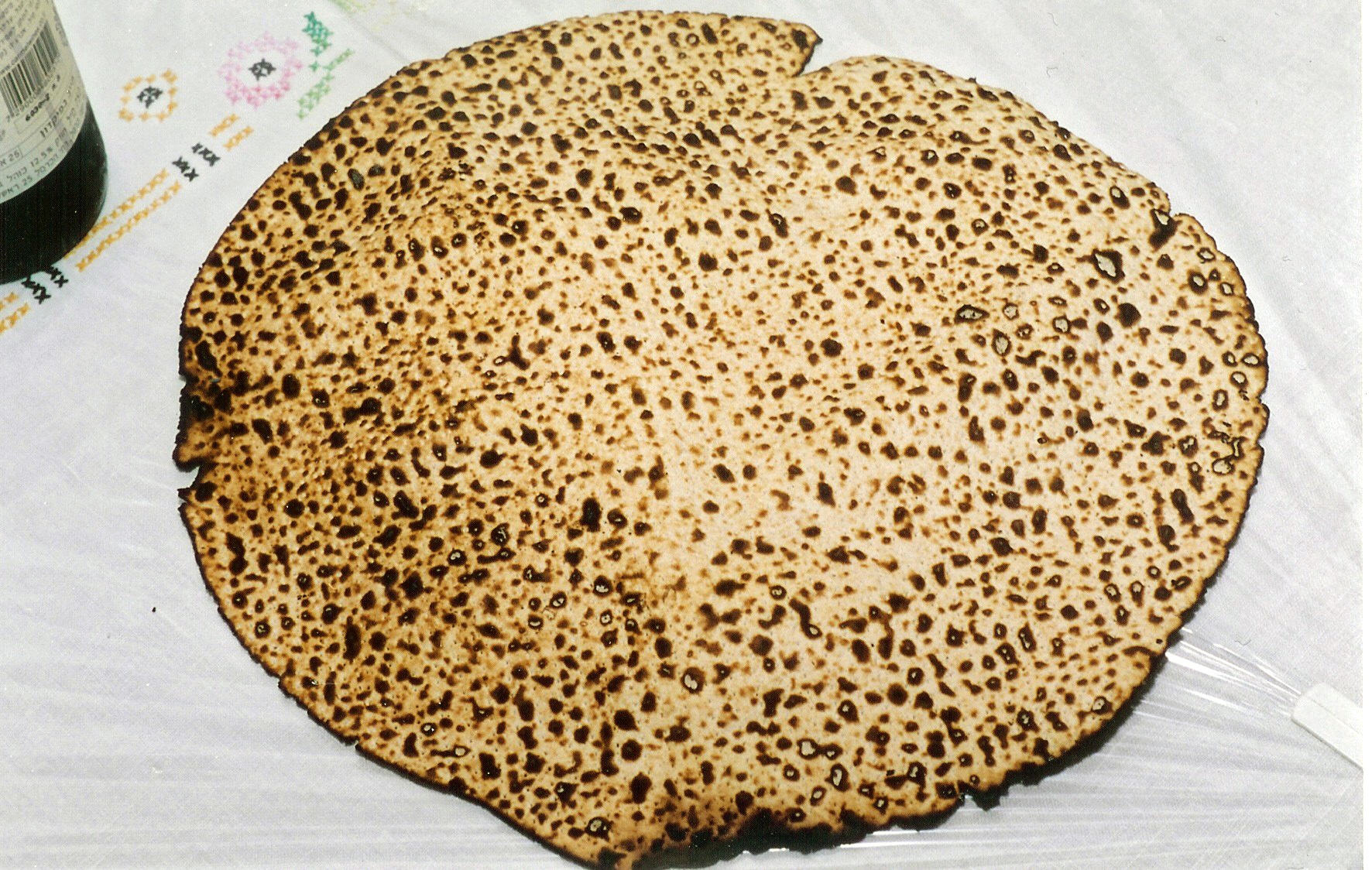
Handmade matzah shmura

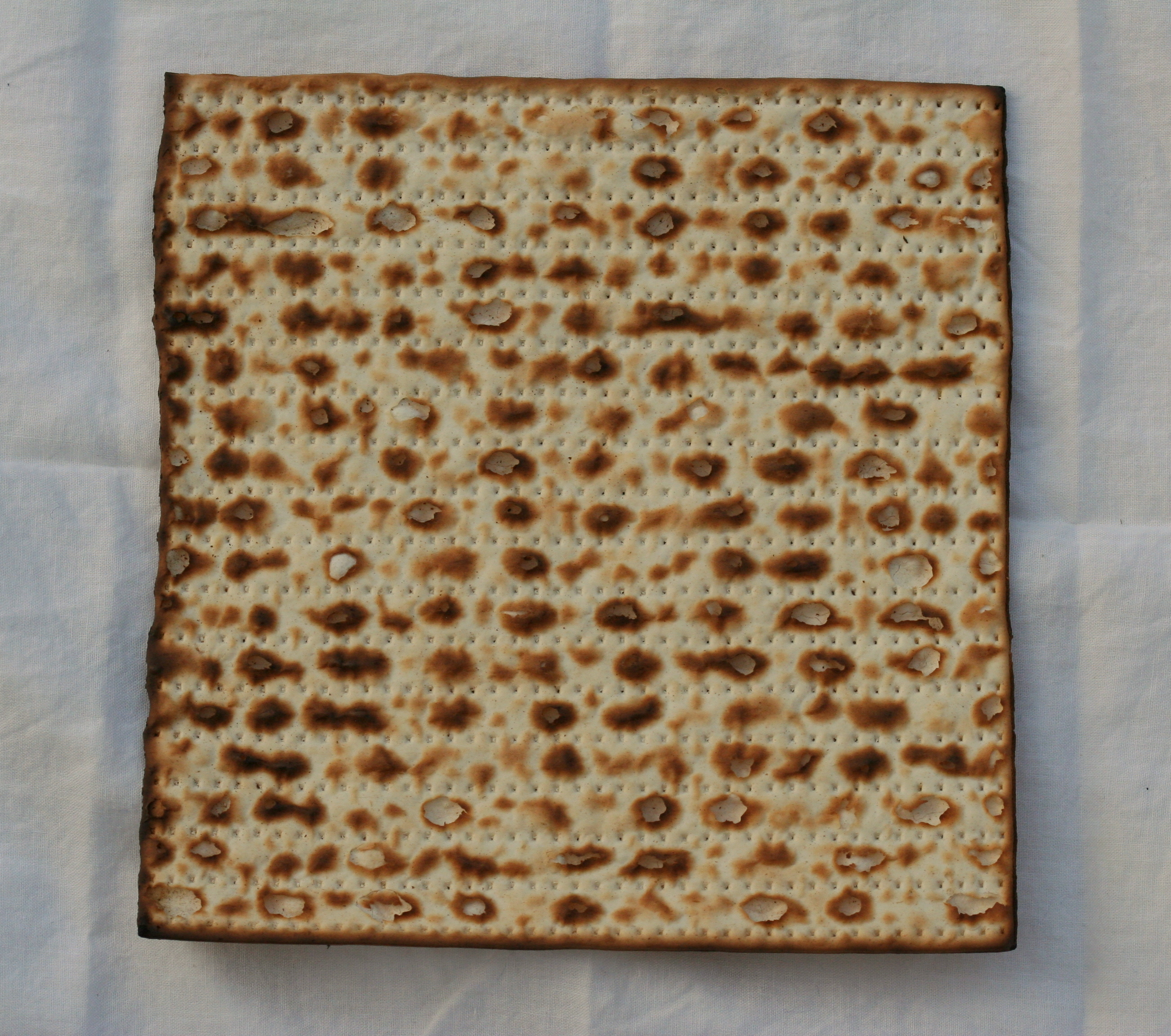
Matzah shmura worked with machine for Passover

Matzah, matzo, mazza, or maẓẓah (Hebrew: מַצָּה, romanized: maṣṣā; IPA: [maˈt͡sa], pl.: matzot or Ashk. matzos) is an unleavened flatbread that is part of Jewish cuisine and forms an integral element of the Passover festival, during which chametz (leavening agent and five grains deemed by halakha to be self-leavening) is forbidden.

According to the Torah, God commanded the Israelites (modernly, Jews and Samaritans) to eat only unleavened bread during the seven-day Passover festival. Matzah can be either soft like a pita or a crisp variety, widely produced commercially because of its long shelf life. The soft matzah only keeps for a day or so unless frozen; very limited commercial production, only in the period leading up to Passover, is available. Some versions of the crisp type are available all year.

Matzah meal and matzah cake meal is crisp matzah that has been ground. The cake meal has a very fine near flour-like consistency, useful in baking, while the standard matzah meal is somewhat coarser and used in cooking. Matzah meal is used to make matzah balls (kneidles/kneidlach), the principal ingredient of kneydlach soup (often translated as "matzah ball soup"). Sephardic Jews typically cook with matzah itself rather than matzah meal.

Matzah that is kosher for Passover is limited in Ashkenazi tradition to plain matzah made from flour and water. The flour may be made from whole or refined grain, but must be made from one of five grains: wheat, spelt, barley, rye, or oat. Some Sephardic communities allow matzah to be made with eggs or fruit juice to be used throughout the holiday, while Ashkenazi Jews do not use such matzah on Passover, except in special circumstances, as for the sick and elderly.

== Biblical sources ==
Matzah is mentioned several times in the Torah. Lot provided matzot or unleavened bread to the two angels or messengers who came to Sodom intending to destroy the place because of its wickedness.

In relation to the Exodus from Egypt:

That night, they are to eat the meat, roasted in the fire; they are to eat it with matzah and maror.

— Exodus 12:8

From the evening of the fourteenth day of the first month until the evening of the twenty-first day, you are to eat matzah.

— Exodus 12:18

You are not to eat any chametz with it; for seven days you are to eat with it matzah, the bread of affliction; for you came out of the land of Egypt in haste. Thus you will remember the day you left the land of Egypt as long as you live.

— Deuteronomy 16:3

For six days you are to eat matzah; on the seventh day there is to be a festive assembly for Hashem your God; do not do any kind of work.

— Deuteronomy 16:8

== Religious significance ==
There are numerous explanations behind the symbolism of matzah:

- Passover is a commemoration of the exodus from Egypt. The biblical narrative relates that the Israelites left Egypt in such haste they could not wait for their bread dough to rise; the bread, when baked, was matzah.
- Matzah symbolizes redemption and freedom, but it is also called lechem oni, "poor man's bread". Thus it serves as a reminder to be humble, and to not forget what life was like in servitude. Also, leaven symbolizes corruption and pride as leaven "puffs up". Eating the "bread of affliction" is both a lesson in humility and an act that enhances the appreciation of freedom.
- The Passover sacrifice was once required to be eaten together with matzah (and maror). Since the destruction of the Temple this sacrifice is not offered, but the final matzah eaten at the seder is considered a reminder of the Passover sacrifice. This matzah is called afikoman, and many explain it as a symbol of salvation in the future. The Passover Seder meal is full of symbols of salvation, including the closing line, "Next year in Jerusalem", but the use of matzah is the oldest symbol of salvation in the Seder.
- Ancient Egypt was the first culture to produce leavened bread, and leavened bread was a symbol of Egyptian culture. Thus, the prohibition on eating leaven served as a rejection of ancient Egyptian culture.
- In ancient Israel, the barley harvest took place around Passover, while the wheat harvest took place several weeks later. Thus, poor people would eat barley around Passover (since that was the only food they possessed), while rich people would eat stored-up wheat. Since barley does not ferment well, the food of the poor would typically be unleavened. The requirement for everyone to eat unleavened bread at Passover promotes social equality, by forcing the rich and poor to eat the same kind of food as they celebrate the holiday together.

== Ingredients ==
Matzo
Nutritional value per 100 g (3.5 oz)
- Energy: 1,653 kJ (395 kcal)
- Carbohydrates: 83.70 g
- Fat: 1.40 g
- Protein: 10.00 g
Vitamins and minerals
| Vitamins | Quantity %DV^{†} |
| Vitamin A | 0 IU |
| Thiamine (B1) | 32% 0.387 mg |
| Riboflavin (B2) | 22% 0.291 mg |
| Niacin (B3) | 24% 3.892 mg |
| Pantothenic acid (B5) | 9% 0.443 mg |
| Vitamin B6 | 7% 0.115 mg |
| Folate (B9) | 4% 17.1 μg |
| Minerals | Quantity %DV^{†} |
| Calcium | 1% 13 mg |
| Iron | 18% 3.16 mg |
| Magnesium | 6% 25 mg |
| Manganese | 28% 0.650 mg |
| Phosphorus | 7% 89 mg |
| Potassium | 4% 112 mg |
| Sodium | 0% 0 mg |
| Zinc | 6% 0.68 mg |
- Other constituents: Quantity
- Water: 4.30 g
- (Values are for matzo made with enriched flour)
- ^{†}Percentages estimated using US recommendations for adults, except for potassium, which is estimated based on expert recommendation from the National Academies.

At the Passover seder, simple matzah made of flour and water is mandatory for all. The flour must be ground from one of the five grains specified in Jewish law for Passover matzah: wheat, barley, spelt, rye or oat. Ashkenazic, but not Sephardi, tradition, requires that matzah made with the addition of wine, fruit juice, onion, garlic, etc., may not be used during the Passover festival except by the elderly or unwell.

Non-Passover matzah is not subject to ritual requirements and may use any kosher ingredients.

=== Gluten-free preparations ===
People who suffer from coeliac disease cannot safely eat cereals containing gluten; the only one of the permitted five grains (wheat, barley, oat, spelt, and rye) without gluten is oat. However, some authorities have expressed doubt about whether oat is truly one of the five grains, or whether it resulted from a historical mistranslation. Some manufacturers produce gluten-free matzah-lookalikes made from potato starch, tapioca, and other non-traditional flour for gluten-intolerant people. However, the Orthodox Union states that, although unleavened gluten-free products may be eaten on Passover, they do not fulfill the commandment (mitzvah) of eating matzah at the Seder, because matzah must be made from one of the five grains.

While oat is considered to be one of the five grains and does not itself contain gluten, matzah made from it would be gluten-free only if there were no contamination by gluten-containing grains. As this contamination is common in commercial oats due to common practices such as shared fields, rail cars, etc., celiac patients should read matzah labels carefully. From 2013 some matzah manufacturers have produced gluten-free oat matzah certified kosher for Passover. Given the doubts about oats truly being one of the five grains, it has been suggested that matzah could be made from a mixture of 90% rice flour and 10% wheat flour (as rice is deemed so bland that the taste of wheat flour dominates, and thus meets ritual requirements), for those who can handle eating the small amount of wheat in this mixture. For those who can eat no wheat, eating oat matzah at the Seder is still considered the best option, and those who cannot eat any of the grains due to illness or allergy (as some small percentage of celiac patients also react to oats, even those oats which are raised properly so as to be truly gluten-free) are excused from the mitzvah.

== Preparation ==
Matzah-forming machine, ca. early 20th century
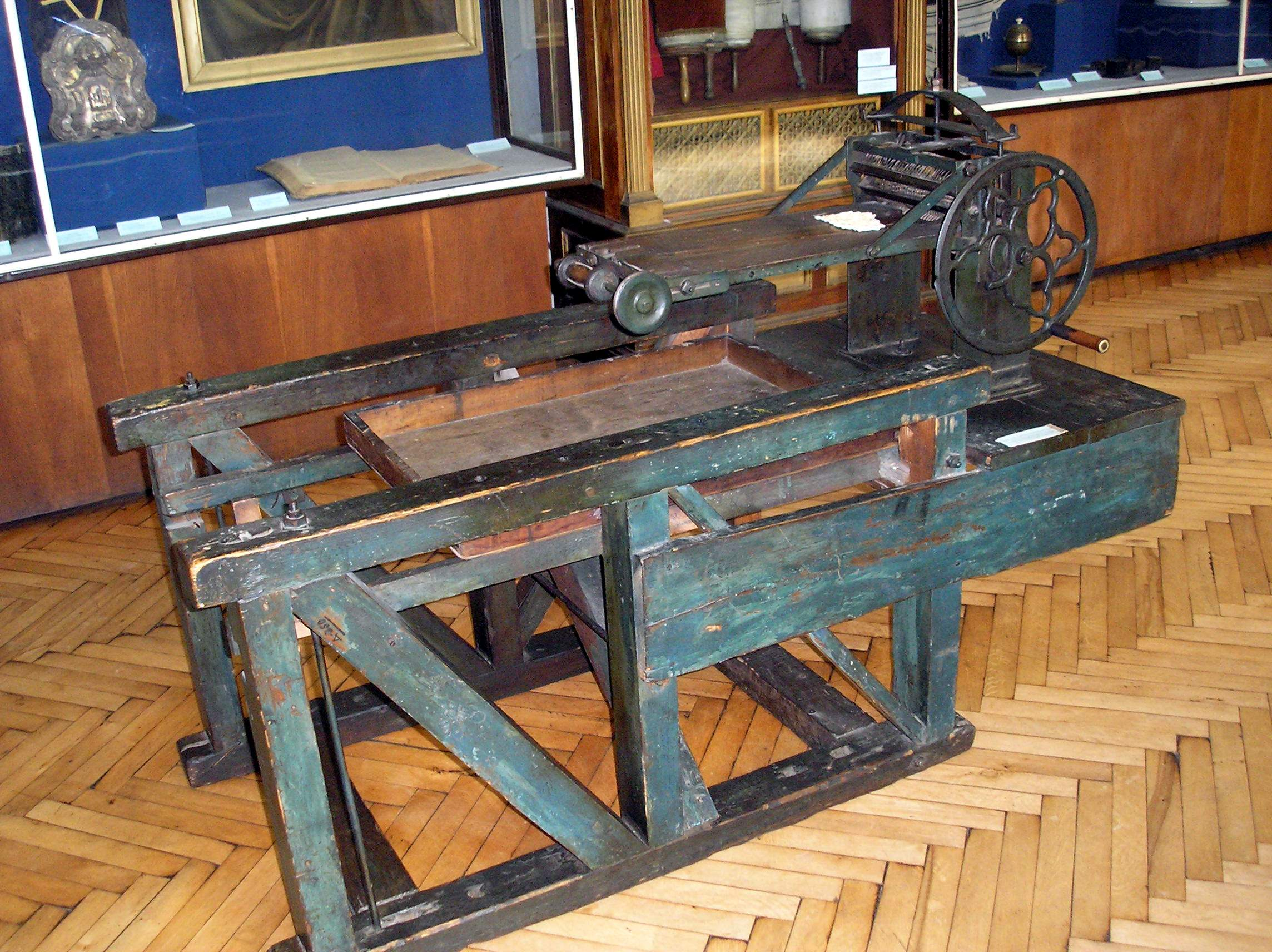
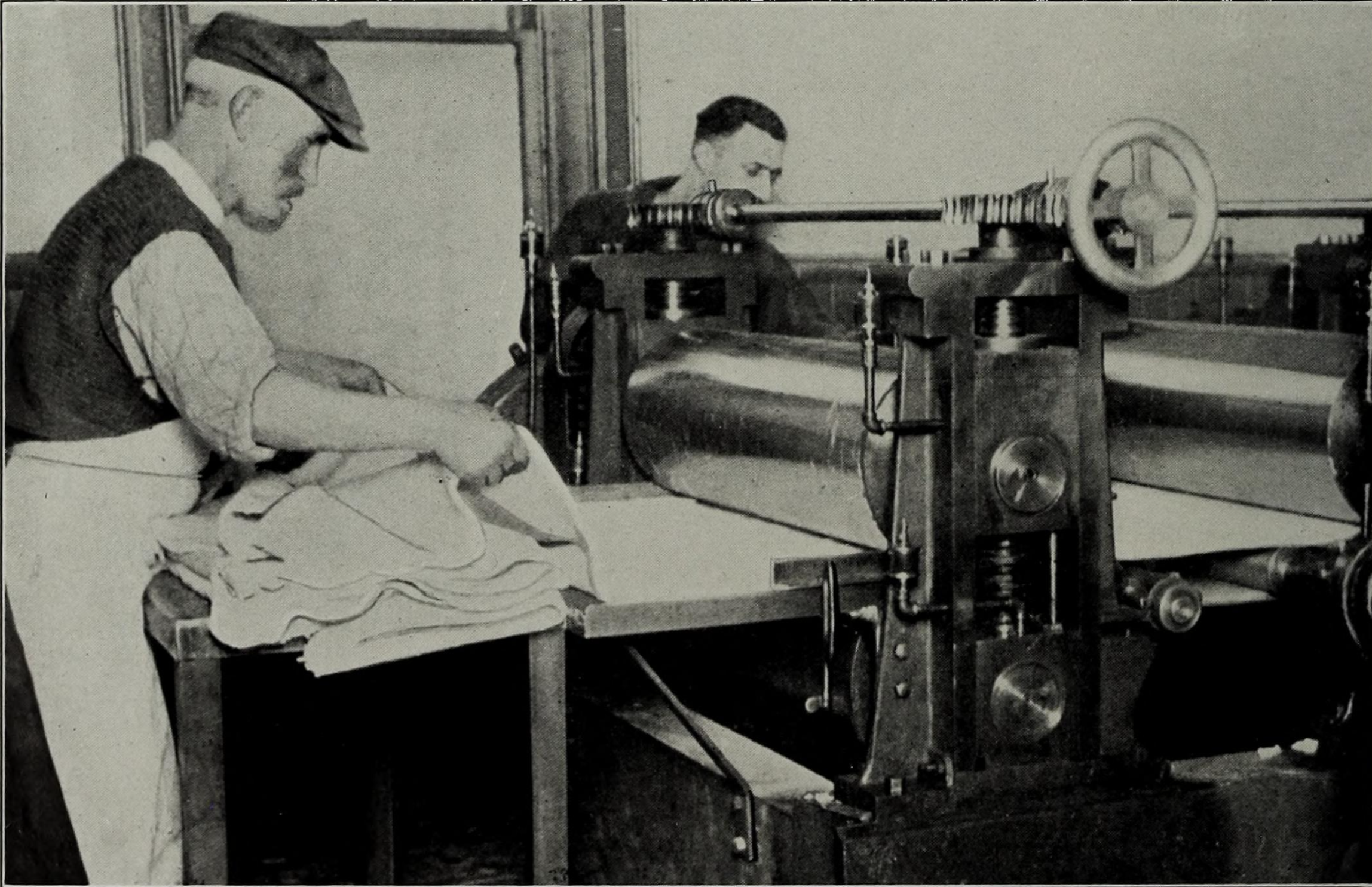
Matzah dough rollers

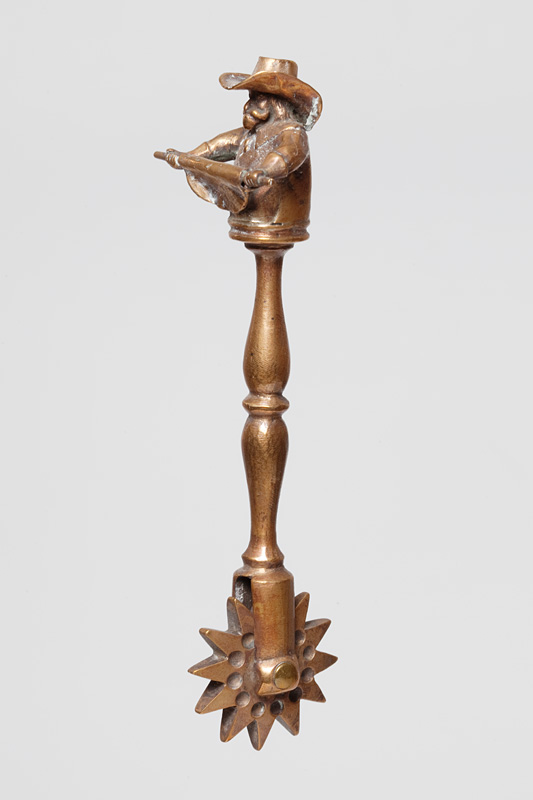
Dated between 1840 and 1860

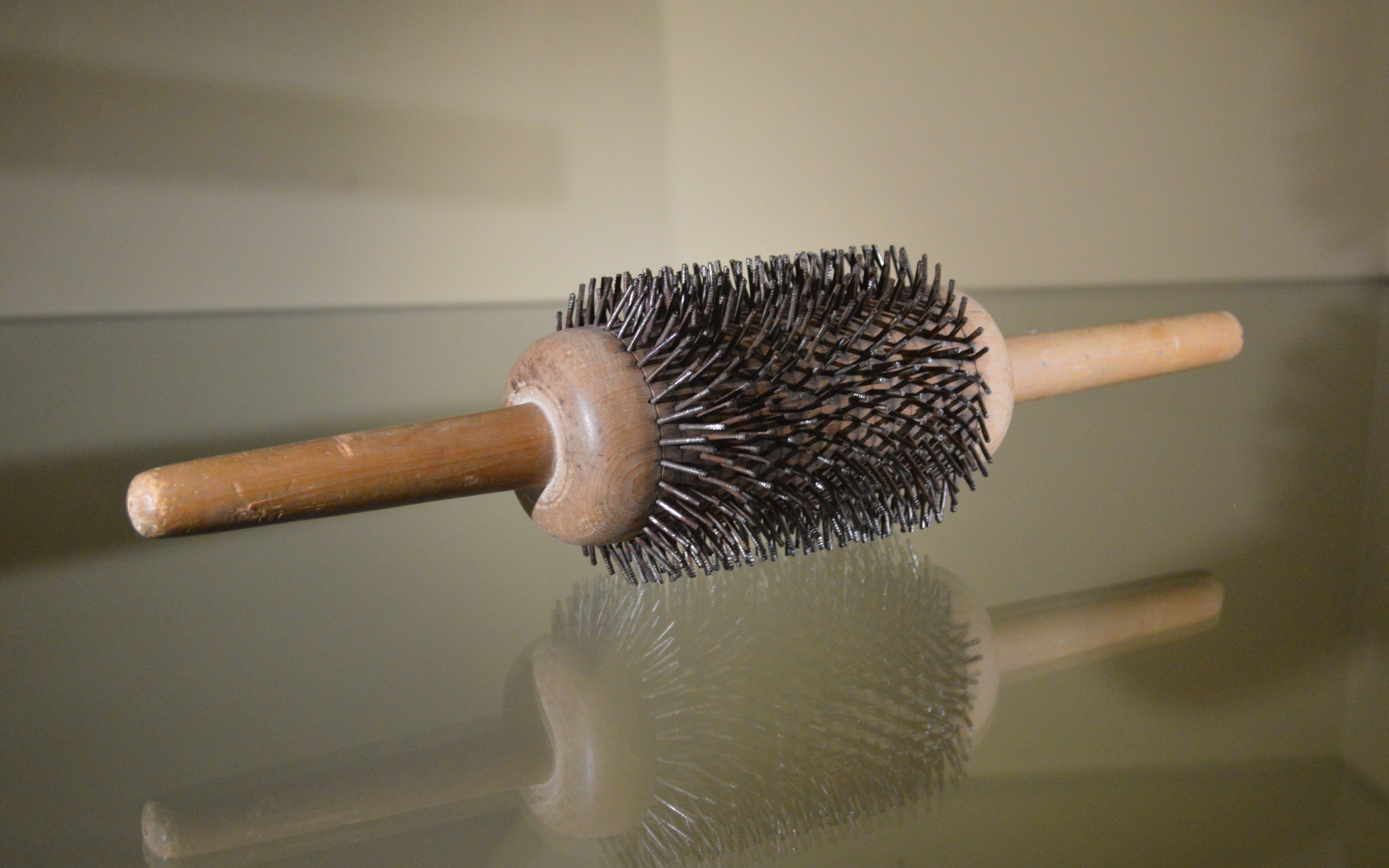
Samarkand, middle 20th century

Matzah dough is quickly mixed and rolled out without an autolyse step as used for leavened breads. Most forms are pricked with a fork or a similar tool to keep the finished product from puffing up, and the resulting flat piece of dough is cooked at high temperature until it develops dark spots, then set aside to cool and, if sufficiently thin, to harden to crispness. Dough is considered to begin the leavening process 18 minutes from the time it gets wet; sooner if eggs, fruit juice, or milk is added to the dough. The entire process of making matzah takes only a few minutes in efficient modern matzah bakeries.

After baking, matzah may be ground into fine, or slightly coarser, crumbs, known as matzah meal, that can be used like flour during the week of Passover when flour can otherwise be used only to make matzah.

== Variations ==
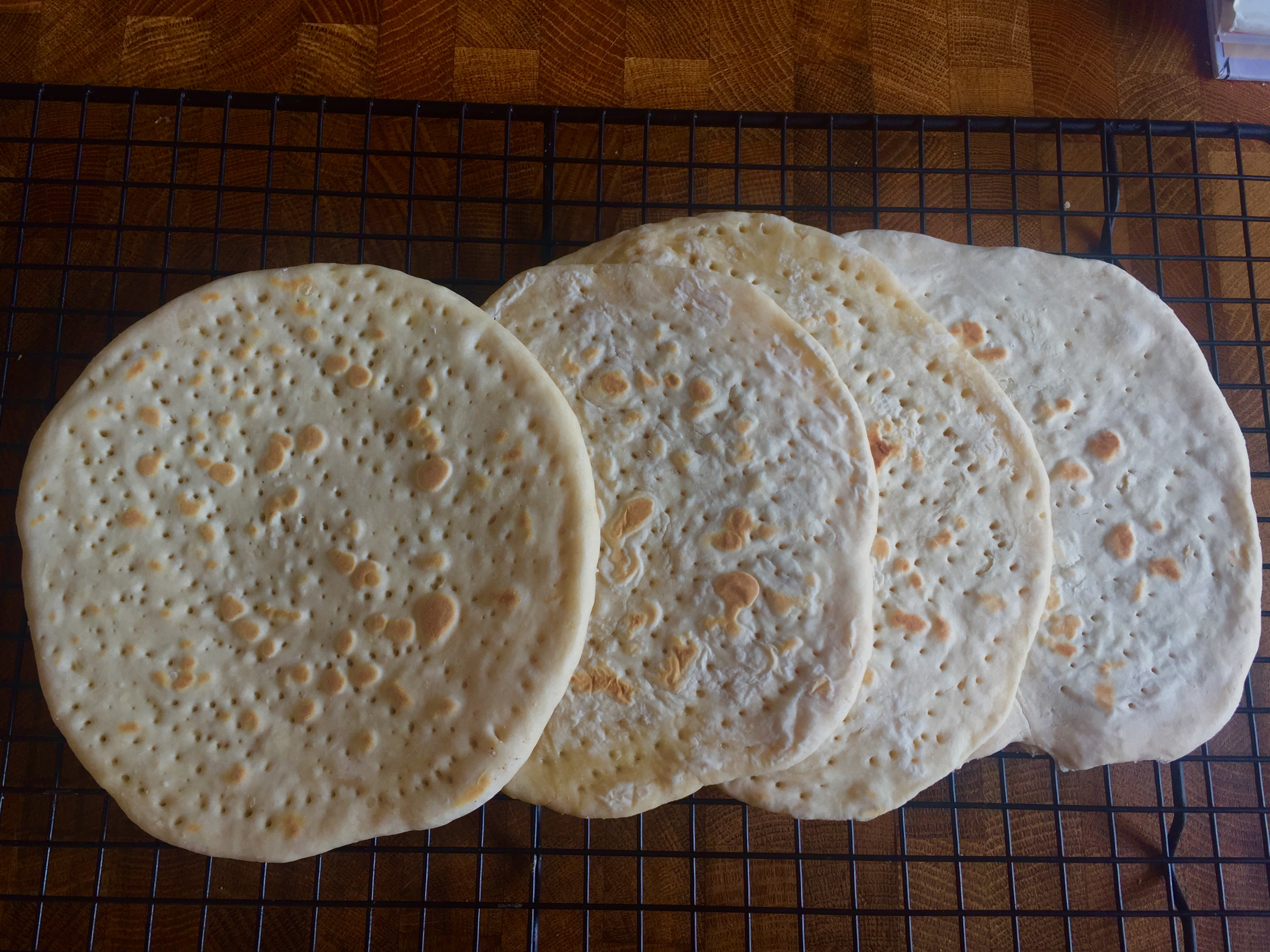
Homemade soft matzah

There are two major forms of matzah. Prior to the late 18th century, all matzah was soft and relatively thick, but thinner, crisper matzah later became popular in parts of Europe due to its longer shelf life. With the invention of the first matzah-making machine in France in 1839, cracker-like mass-produced matzah became the most common form in Europe and North America and is now ubiquitous in all Ashkenazic and most Sephardic communities. Yemenite and Iraqi Jews continue to use a form of soft matzah which looks like Greek pita or like a tortilla. Soft matzah is made only by hand, and generally with shmurah flour.

Flavored varieties of matzah are produced commercially, such as poppy seed- or onion-flavored. Oat and spelt matzah with kosher certification are produced. Oat matzah is generally suitable for those who cannot eat gluten. Whole wheat, bran and organic matzah are also available. Chocolate-covered matzah is a favorite among children, although some consider it "enriched matzah" and will not eat it during the Passover holiday. A quite different flat confection of chocolate and nuts that resembles matzah is sometimes called "chocolate matzah".

Mass-produced matzah contains typically 111 calories per 1-ounce/28g (USDA Nutrient Database), about the same as rye crispbread.

=== Shmurah matzah ===
Shĕmura ("guarded") matzah (Hebrew: מַצָּה שְׁמוּרָה matsa shĕmura) is made from grain that has been under special supervision from the time it was harvested to ensure that no fermentation has occurred, and that it is suitable for eating on the first night of Passover. (Shĕmura wheat may be formed into either handmade or machine-made matzah, while non-shĕmura wheat is only used for machine-made matzah. It is possible to hand-bake matzah in shĕmura style from non-shmurah flour—this is a matter of style, it is not actually in any way shĕmura—but such matzah has rarely been produced since the introduction of machine-made matzah.)

Haredi Judaism is scrupulous about the supervision of matzah and have the custom of baking their own or at least participating in some stage of the baking process. Rabbi Chaim Halberstam of Sanz ruled in the 19th century that machine-made matzah were chametz. According to that opinion, handmade non-shmurah matzah may be used on the eighth day of Passover outside of the Holy Land. However the non-Hasidic Haredi community of Jerusalem follows the custom that machine-made matzah may be used, with preference to the use of shĕmurah flour, in accordance with the ruling of Rabbi Yosef Chaim Sonnenfeld, who ruled that machine-made matzah may be preferable to hand made in some cases. The commentators to the Shulhan `Aruch record that it is the custom of some of Diaspora Jewry to be scrupulous in giving Hallah from the dough used for baking "Matzat Mitzvah" (the shĕmurah matzah eaten during Passover) to a Kohen child to eat.

=== Egg matzah ===
The requirement for eating Matzah at the Seder cannot be fulfilled with "egg matza."

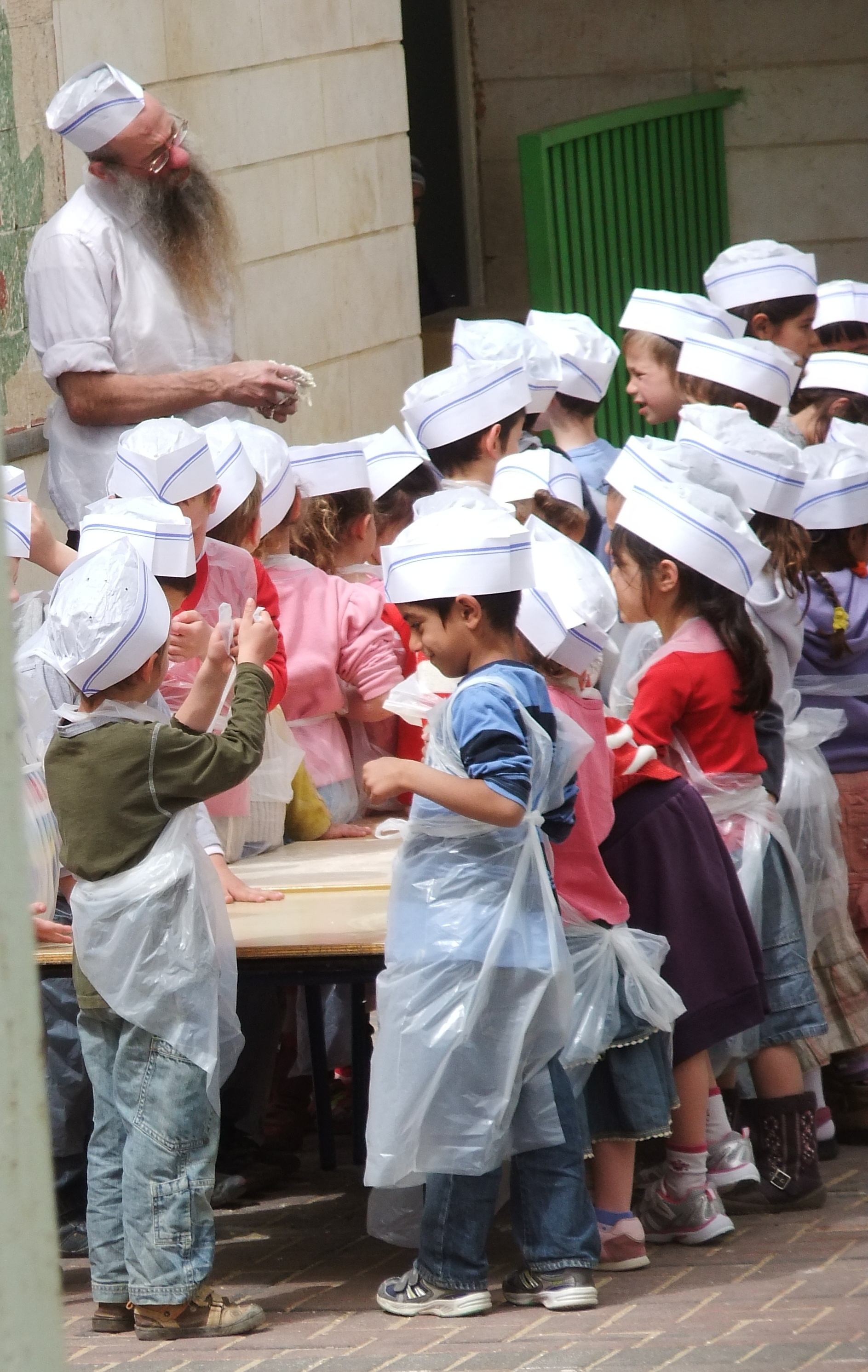
Children preparing matzah (Ofra, 2012)

Matzah sticks are sticks of matzah often dipped in chocolate haschahar by children in Israel.

"Egg (sometimes enriched) matzah" are matzot usually made with fruit juice, often grape juice or apple juice, instead of water, but not necessarily with eggs themselves. There is a custom among some Ashkenazi Jews not to eat them during Passover, except for the elderly, infirm, or children, who cannot digest plain matzah; these matzot are considered to be kosher for Passover if prepared otherwise properly. The issue of whether egg matzah is allowed for Passover comes down to whether there is a difference between the various liquids that can be used. Water facilitates a fermentation of grain flour specifically into what is defined as chametz, but the question is whether fruit juice, eggs, honey, oil or milk are also deemed to do so within the strict definitions of Jewish laws regarding chametz.

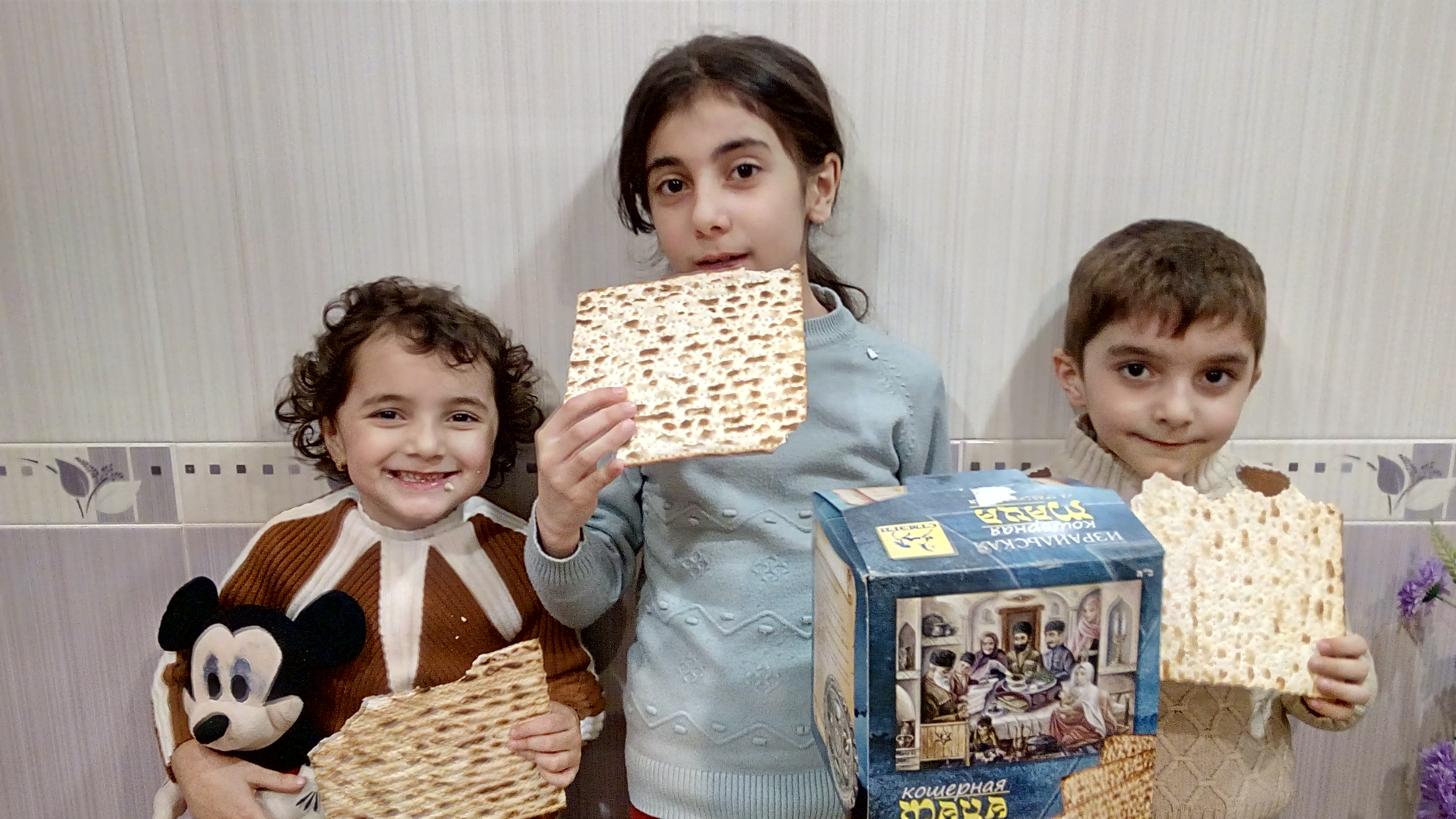
Children eating commercially made matzah (Azerbaijan, 2018)

The Talmud, Pesachim 35a, states that liquid food extracts do not cause flour to leaven the way that water does. According to this view, flour mixed with other liquids would not need to be treated with the same care as flour mixed with water. The Tosafot (commentaries) explain that such liquids only produce a leavening reaction within flour if they themselves have had water added to them and otherwise the dough they produce is completely permissible for consumption during Passover, whether or not made according to the laws applying to matzot.

As a result, Joseph ben Ephraim Karo, author of the Shulchan Aruch or "Code of Jewish Law" (Orach Chayim 462:4) granted blanket permission for the use of any matzah made from non-water-based dough, including egg matzah, on Passover. Many egg matzah boxes no longer include the message, "Ashkenazi custom is that egg matzah is only allowed for children, elderly and the infirm during Passover." Even amongst those who consider that enriched matzot may not be eaten during Passover, it is permissible to retain it in the home.

==== Chocolate-covered matzah ====
Chocolate-covered matzah was sold in boxes as a standard product, alongside boxes of egg matzah.

The matzah itself is not Hamotzi (meaning that it is Mezonot).

== Cooking with matzah ==
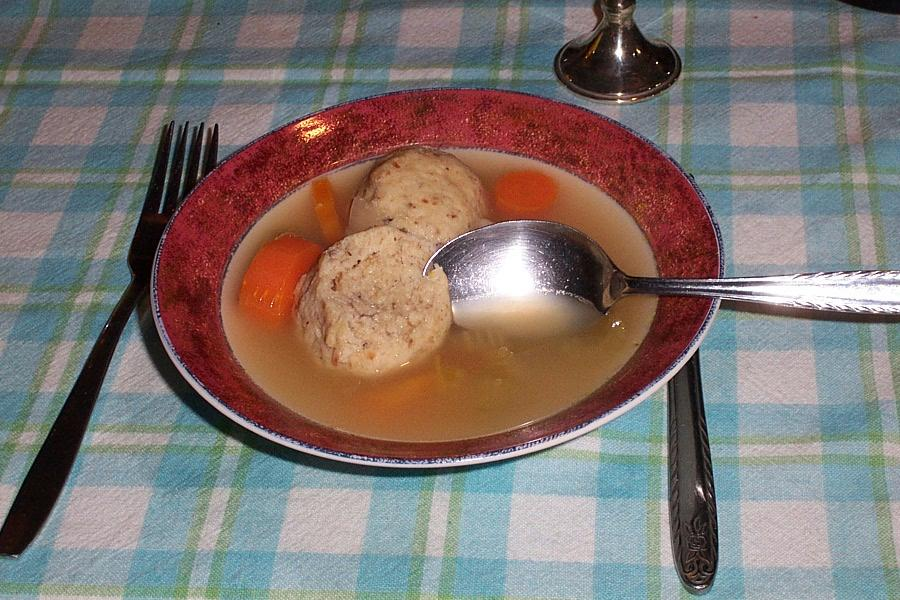
Matzah balls

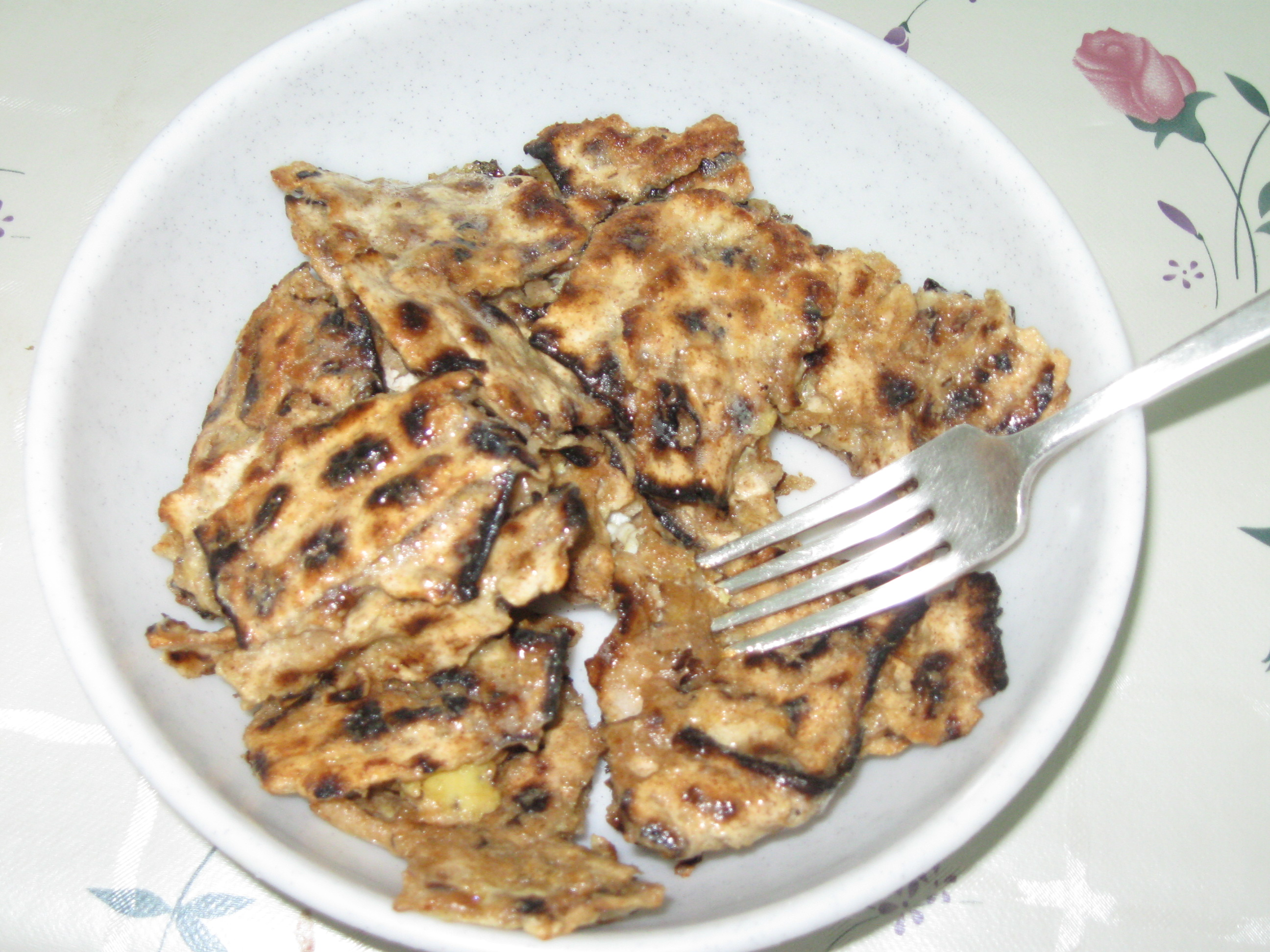
Matzah brei

Matzah may be used whole, broken, chopped ("matzah farfel"), or finely ground ("matzah meal"); to make numerous matzah-based cooked dishes. These include matzah balls, which are traditionally served in chicken soup; matzah brei, a dish of Ashkenazi origin made from matzah soaked in water, mixed with beaten egg, and fried; helzel, poultry neck skin stuffed with matzah meal; matzah pizza, in which the piece of matzah takes the place of pizza crust and is topped with melted cheese and sauce; and kosher for Passover cakes and cookies, which are made with matzah meal or a finer variety called "cake meal" that gives them a denser texture than ordinary baked foods made with flour. Hasidic Jews do not cook with matzah, believing that mixing it with water may allow leavening; this stringency is known as gebrochts. However, Jews who avoid eating gebrochts will eat cooked matzah dishes on the eighth day of Passover outside the Land of Israel, as the eighth day is of rabbinic and not Torah origin. Matzah meal or gebrokts in Yiddish meaning "broken pieces" is accepted in some communities but not others.

Sephardim use matzah soaked in water or stock to make pies or lasagne, known as mina, méguena, mayena or Italian: scacchi.

== In Christianity ==
Communion wafers used by the Roman Catholic Church as well as in some Protestant traditions for the Eucharist are flat, unleavened bread. The main reason for the use of this bread is the belief that, because the Last Supper was described in the Synoptic Gospels as a Passover meal, the unleavened matzah bread was used by Jesus when he held it up and said "this is my body". All Byzantine Rite churches use leavened bread for the Eucharist as this symbolizes the risen Christ.

Some Oriental Orthodox and Eastern Catholic Christians use leavened bread, as in the east there is the tradition, based upon the gospel of John, that leavened bread was on the table of the Last Supper. In the Armenian Apostolic Church, the Ethiopian Orthodox Tewahedo Church and Eritrean Orthodox Tewahedo Church, unleavened bread called qǝddus qurban in Ge'ez, the liturgical language of the Eritreans and Ethiopians, is used for communion.

Saint Thomas Christians living on the Malabar coast of Kerala, India have the customary celebration of Pesaha in their homes. On the evening before Good Friday, Pesaha bread is made at home. It is made with unleavened flour and they consume a sweet drink made up of coconut milk and jaggery along with this bread. On the Pesaha night, the bread is baked (steamed) immediately after rice flour is mixed with water and they pierce it many times with handle of the spoon to let out steam so that the bread will not rise (this custom is called "juthante kannu kuthal" in the Malayalam language meaning "piercing the bread according to the custom of Jews"). This bread is cut by the head of the family and shared among the family members.

== World War II ==
At the end of World War II, the National Jewish Welfare Board had a matzah factory (according to the American Jewish Historical Society, it was probably the Manischewitz matzah factory in New Jersey) produce matzah in the shape of a large "V" for "Victory", for use in the U.S. and military bases overseas by Jewish military personnel for Passover Seders.

== 'Matzah Island' ==
Mazzesinsel (Matzah Island) sign in Yiddish in Vienna’s Jewish district

The large number of Jewish inhabitants in the central areas of Vienna's 2nd district, Leopoldstadt, led to the area becoming known by the nickname Mazzesinsel ('Matzo Island'; Yiddish: מצותינדזל, matsesindzl), a name used both by Vienna's general public and by Jews themselves.

== In film ==
Streit's is the story of the last family-owned matzah bakery in America during their final year at their historic New York City factory.

== See also ==
- Blood libel, antisemitic canard claiming that matzah is baked with Christian children's blood
