= Days of week on Hebrew calendar =

The modern Hebrew calendar has been designed to ensure that certain holy days and festivals do not fall on certain days of the week. As a result, there are only four possible patterns of days on which festivals can fall. (Note that Jewish days start at sunset of the preceding day indicated in this article.)

== Hebrew week days ==
Hebrew name	Abbreviation	Translation	English equivalent
Yom Rishon (יום ראשון)	יום א'	First day	Sunset on Saturday to sunset on Sunday
Yom Sheni (יום שני)	יום ב'	Second day	Sunset on Sunday to sunset on Monday
Yom Shlishi (יום שלישי)	יום ג'	Third day	Sunset on Monday to sunset on Tuesday
Yom Revii (יום רביעי)	יום ד'	Fourth day	Sunset on Tuesday to sunset on Wednesday
Yom Hamishi (יום חמישי)	יום ה'	Fifth day	Sunset on Wednesday to sunset on Thursday
Yom Shishi (יום שישי)	יום ו'	Sixth day	Sunset on Thursday to sunset on Friday
Yom Shabbat (יום שבת)	יום ש'	Sabbath day	Sunset on Friday to sunset on Saturday

== Reasons ==
The modern Hebrew calendar has been arranged so that Yom Kippur does not fall on a Friday (Yom Shishi) or Sunday (Yom Rishon), and Hoshana Rabbah does not fall on Shabbat. These rules have been instituted because Shabbat restrictions also apply to Yom Kippur, and if Yom Kippur were to fall on Friday (Yom Shishi), it would not be possible to make necessary preparations for Shabbat, including candle lighting, because the preceding day is Yom Kippur. Similarly, if Yom Kippur fell on a Sunday (Yom Rishon), it would not be possible to make the necessary preparations for Yom Kippur, including candle lighting, because the preceding day is Shabbat. Also, the laws of Shabbat override those of Hoshana Rabbah (the seventh day of Sukkot), so that if Hoshana Rabbah were to fall on Shabbat certain rituals that are a part of Hoshana Rabbah services (such as carrying willows, which is work) could not be performed in that year.

As a consequence, in the case of Yom Kippur, which falls on 10 Tishrei and cannot fall on a Friday or Sunday, the days in Cheshvan and/or Kislev are adjusted so that Rosh Hashanah, which falls on 1 Tishrei, does not fall on a Wednesday (Yom Revii) or Friday (Yom Shishi). And, in the case of Hoshana Rabbah, which falls on 21 Tishrei and cannot fall on a Saturday, Rosh Hashanah cannot be on a Sunday. This leaves only four days on which Rosh Hashanah is allowed to fall: Monday, Tuesday, Thursday and Saturday (i.e. the first, second, or fourth days of the week, or Shabbat), which are also referred as the "four gates" (Hebrew: ארבעה שערים, romanized: arba'a shearim).

== The four gates ==
Since three arrangements cannot occur within the fixed calendar, most holidays can each occur on one of four possible days.

All the major holy days and festivals fall in the months of Nisan through Tishrei, months one to seven. These months always have the same number of days, alternating 30 and 29. The next two months are Cheshvan and Kislev, months eight and nine. Both or either of these months can have either 29 or 30 days, allowing for adjustments to be made and the schedule in the coming year to be manipulated. (On a regular year, Cheshvan has 29 days and Kislev has 30 days). The months of Tevet and Shevat, months ten and eleven, have 29 and 30 days respectively. Finally, in a regular year the month of Adar has 29 days, while in a leap year Adar I of 30 days is added before the regular Adar, which becomes Adar II (still of 29 days). The result is that the period from 1 Tevet to 29 Cheshvan is fixed, except that in a leap year Adar I of 30 days is added; and all adjustments are made using 29/30 Cheshvan and/or 29/30 Kislev.

The period from 1 Adar (or Adar II, in leap years) to 29 Cheshvan contains all of the festivals specified in the Bible - Purim (14 Adar), Pesach (15 Nisan), Shavuot (6 Sivan), Rosh Hashanah (1 Tishrei), Yom Kippur (10 Tishrei), Sukkot (15 Tishrei), and Shemini Atzeret (22 Tishrei). This period is fixed, during which no adjustments are made. The result is that all dates from 1 Nisan through 29 (or 30) Cheshvan can each fall on one of four days of the week. Dates during Kislev can fall on any of six days of the week; during Tevet and Shevat, five days; and dates during Adar (or Adar I and II, in leap years) can each fall on one of four days of the week.

Gate	Frequency	Purim	Passover (first day)	Yom HaZikaron	Yom Ha'atzmaut	Shavuot (first day)	17 Tammuz/ Tisha B'Av	Rosh Hashanah/ Sukkot/ Shmini Atzeret/ (first day)	Yom Kippur	Hanukkah (first day)	10 Tevet	Tu Bishvat	Purim Katan (only in leap years)	Gate that follows
1	31.9%	Sun	Tue	Mon*	Tue*	Wed	Tue	Thu	Sat	Wed or Thu	Wed, Thu, or Fri	Tue, Wed, or Thu	Wed or Fri	Gates 1, 3, or 4
2	28.6%	Tue	Thu	Tue	Wed	Fri	Thu	Sat	Mon	Fri or Sat	Fri or Sun	Thu or Sat	Fri or Sun	Gates 1, 2, or 4
3	28.0%	Thu	Sat	Wed†	Thu†	Sun	Sun*	Mon	Wed	Sun or Mon	Sun or Tue	Sat or Mon	Sun or Tue	Gates 1, 2, or 3
4	11.5%	Fri	Sun	Wed‡	Thu‡	Mon	Sun	Tue	Thu	Mon	Tue	Mon	Tue	Gates 2 or 3
				†Pushed back from Thu/Fri ‡Pushed back from Fri/Sat			*Postponed from Shabbat							

With each gate, some unusual effects occur.

=== Gate 1 (31.9%) ===
- Neither the Three Pilgrimage Festivals nor Rosh Hashanah coincide with the Sabbath nor fall on Sunday, therefore no additions to the Yom Tov kiddush (i.e. the Sabbath additions and havdalah) are said during the course of the year.
- Since Purim falls on Sunday, the 13th of Adar, known as the Fast of Esther, falls on Saturday. Usually, fasts other than Yom Kippur are postponed to the following Sunday. But as this Sunday is Purim, and fasts are usually not observed on Friday, the fast is advanced to the prior Thursday (the 11th of Adar).
- Vayehi Noam, Psalm 91 and the "verses of blessing" are recited at Maariv on Purim, due to it immediately following the Sabbath. (V'Ata Kadosh is recited at Maariv on Purim even on weeknights.)
- This is the only instance in which there is a Sabbath of Chol HaMoed for both Passover and Sukkot.
- Yom HaZikaron is postponed from Sunday to Monday, and Yom Ha'atzmaut is postponed from Monday to Tuesday, so that preparations cannot interfere with Shabbat.
- No leniencies are made for the observance of Tisha B'Av nor the Tenth of Av.
- During Tishrei, three holidays start on Thursday. In the diaspora, the eruv tavshilin is prepared thrice. (In Israel, it is only made on the eve of Rosh Hashanah.)
- In Israel, this is the only occasion with a "three-day holiday" (the two days of Rosh Hashanah followed by the Sabbath).
  - This is the only gate in the Diaspora to contain multiple "three-day holidays."
- Due to immediately following Rosh Hashanah, an abridged form of Kabbalat Shabbat is recited at Maariv on Shabbat Shuvah.
- The Fast of Gedaliah falls on Saturday. Since fasts other than Yom Kippur are not observed on Saturday, this is observed on the following Sunday. This leaves an interval of just five days between fasts, the shortest ever on the Jewish Calendar (other than the Fast of Behav).
- Vayehi Noam, Psalm 91 and V'Ata Kadosh are recited on Motza'ei Shabbat Shuvah, due to their occurrence being exactly one week before Yom Kippur.
- Ashkenazim recite Avinu Malkeinu on the eve of Yom Kippur, due to it largely being omitted on Yom Kippur itself.
- Yom Kippur occurs on Saturday. This is the only occurrence in which a fast is ever observed on Saturday. Ashkenazim do not recite Avinu Malkeinu except during Ne'ila.
  - This is also the only case in which the following Torah reading (in this case, V'Zot HaBerachah) is not read on Saturday afternoon and in which a haftarah is read on Saturday afternoon.
- The "verses of blessing" are recited on the expiry of Yom Kippur, due to it coinciding with the Sabbath. (Vayehi Noam, Psalm 91 and V'Ata Kadosh are not recited, because Sukkot falls before the upcoming Sabbath.)
- This is the only instance in which Bereshit is not read during the Torah reading on the preceding Thursday.
- If the previous gate was also 1, this is a leap year; and, the following occur:
  - Vayakhel is read as it does not coincide with Parshat Shekalim. (Parshat Shekalim instead coincides with Pekudei.) This is one of three cases in which Vayakhel's proper haftarah is read. (The others are during a Gate 4 leap year and during Gate 2 on the last day of Hanukkah when both Cheshvan and Kislev have 30 days.)
  - Chukat coincides with Rosh Chodesh Tammuz (rather than Korach in other Gate 1 years). Due to the lack of yom tov sheni shel galuyot, this is the only case in Israel in which the haftarah of Chukat is omitted. (It is also omitted in the Diaspora during Gate 2 due to being paired with Balak.)
  - Pinechas falls on 14 Tammuz (meaning that its proper haftarah is read), and Matot and Masei are read separately. This also means that Nitzavim-Vayelech are the only doubled-up parshiot during the year (Tishrei-Elul).
- If this is a leap year and the previous gate was 2, the following occur:
  - According to the custom that the haftarah of Acharei Mot is read for Kedoshim whenever Acharei Mot is pre-empted by a special haftarah, the haftarah of Kedoshim is read (the rarest-read haftarah). This is because Acharei Mot-Kedoshim are doubled up in non-leap years; and, in other leap years, either Kedoshim coincides with Rosh Chodesh Iyar (Gate 2), Acharei Mot (or Kedoshim in Israel) falls on the eve of Rosh Chodesh Iyar (Gate 3), or Acharei Mot coincides with Shabbat HaGadol (Gate 1-1 and Gate 4).
  - Tazria's proper haftarah is read.
- If the previous gate was 3, this is not a leap year.
- If Cheshvan has 29 days, then Kislev will have either 29 or 30 days. This is the only occurrence in which it happens.
- If both Cheshvan and Kislev have 30 days, then the Tenth of Tevet will occur on Friday, one of two public fasts that can possibly be observed on a Friday (the other being the Fast of the Firstborn). The fast is not broken until nightfall, after the Sabbath begins.
- If both Cheshvan and Kislev have 30 days, then Purim Katan, the holiday that only occurs in leap years, will occur on Friday.

=== Gate 2 (28.6%) ===
- The eruv tavshilin is prepared prior to the first day Passover in the diaspora and prior to Shavuot in both the diaspora and Israel.
- Yom HaZikaron and Yom Ha'atzmaut are actually observed on 4 Iyar and 5 Iyar respectively.
- Yom tov sheni shel galuyot for Shavuot falls on Saturday, which results in the weekly Torah portion between Israel and the diaspora to be out of sync between Naso and Balak. To compensate for this, Chukat-Balak are doubled up in the diaspora. (In Israel, these two parshiot are always read separately.)
  - In the diaspora, the usual Torah reading of the second day of Shavuot (Deuteronomy 15:19–16:17) is extended to its length on Shemini Atzeret (Deuteronomy 14:22–16:17) to accommodate the seven readings on the Sabbath.
- Vayehi Noam, Psalm 91, V'Ata Kadosh and the "verses of blessing" are recited on the expiry of Shavuot in the Diaspora, due to it coinciding with the Sabbath.
- Following Tisha B'Av, bathing, laundering, shaving, and taking a haircut are all permitted immediately after the fast, in preparation for the Sabbath. These, along with the rest of the restrictions of the Nine Days, are normally postponed until midday on the Tenth of Av.
- Rosh Hashanah, Sukkot, and Shemini Atzeret begin on Saturday. On Rosh Hashanah, since blowing the Shofar is prohibited on the Sabbath, the shofar is blown only on the second day. Ashkenazim do not recite Avinu Malkeinu on Saturday. In Ashkenazic communities, Tashlich is also postponed to the second day. On Sukkot, the Four Species, which are not taken on the Sabbath, are unused on the first day.
- This is the only instance in which no day of Chol HaMoed Sukkot coincides with the Sabbath. Ecclesiastes, which is usually read on the Sabbath of Chol HaMoed, is thus read on the first day of Sukkot in Israel and on Shemini Atzeret in the diaspora.
- In the diaspora, the first reading from the Torah on Shemini Atzeret (Deuteronomy 14:22–15:23) is split into three readings (i.e. the same readings as when yom tov sheni shel galuyot for the last day of Passover and for Shavuot coincide with the Sabbath) to accommodate the seven readings on the Sabbath.
- In Israel, Simchat Torah, as it always coincides with Shemini Atzeret in Israel, falls on Saturday, the only time Simchat Torah ever falls on Saturday. (In the diaspora, Simchat Torah never occurs on Saturday.)
  - In communities where the Torah is read at Maariv on Simchat Torah, this is the only occurrence of the Torah being read during Maariv, Shacharit and Mincha on the same day.
  - This is also the only instance in which Bereshit is read during the Torah reading of Saturday afternoon.
- Vayehi Noam, Psalm 91, V'Ata Kadosh and the "verses of blessing" are recited on the expiry of Shemini Atzeret/Simchat Torah in Israel, due to it coinciding with the Sabbath.
- This is the only instance in which Bereshit is read during the Torah reading on the preceding Monday (in both the diaspora and Israel).
- If the previous gate was also 2, this is a leap year.
  - If this is a leap year, then Tazria's proper haftarah is read.
- If the previous gate was 4, this is not a leap year.
- The Sabbath of Vayeshev falls during Hanukkah (this is the only case in which this occurs) and one of two uncommon haftarot is read for Miketz:
  - If both Cheshvan and Kislev have 29 days, Hanukkah will begin and end on Friday and the Sabbath of Miketz will not be during Hanukkah (in which case Miketz's proper haftarah will thus be read).
  - If both Cheshvan and Kislev have 30 days, Hanukkah will begin and end on the Sabbath and the haftarah for Vayakhel (which is only read in leap years when the preceding gate was 1) is read for Miketz.
- If both Cheshvan and Kislev have 29 days, then the Tenth of Tevet will occur on Friday, one of two public fasts that can possibly be observed on a Friday (the other being the Fast of the Firstborn). The fast is not broken until nightfall, after the Sabbath begins.
- If both Cheshvan and Kislev have 30 days, then Rosh Chodesh Shevat and Tu Bishvat will occur on Saturday. This means that on Rosh Chodesh Shevat, two Torah scrolls are used for the Sabbath morning Torah reading: one for Va'eira and one for Rosh Chodesh.
- If both Cheshvan and Kislev have 29 days, then Purim Katan, the holiday that only occurs in leap years, will occur on Friday.

=== Gate 3 (28.0%) ===
- In Jerusalem, Shushan Purim falls on Friday, and the Purim feast is held earlier in the day due to the approaching Sabbath.
- Rosh Chodesh Nisan occurs on Saturday. Three Torah scrolls are used for the Sabbath morning Torah reading: one for Vayikra (Tazria in leap years), another for Rosh Chodesh, and a third for Parshat Hachodesh.
- The Fast of the Firstborn occurs on Friday, one of two public fasts that can possibly be observed on a Friday (the other being the Tenth of Tevet).
- No day of Chol HaMoed Passover coincides with the Sabbath. Song of Songs, which is usually read on the Sabbath of Chol HaMoed, is thus read on the first day of Passover in Israel and on the eighth day in the diaspora.
- The eruv tavshilin is prepared prior to the final day(s) of Passover (in both the diaspora and Israel).
- Yom tov sheni shel galuyot for the final day of Passover falls on Saturday, which results in the weekly Torah portion between Israel and the diaspora to be out of sync between Shemini and Bechukotai in common years or between Acharei Mot and Masei in leap years. To compensate for this, either Behar and Bechukotai (in non-leap years) or Matot and Masei (in leap years) are read separately in Israel. (In the diaspora, Behar-Bechukotai are doubled up as with all other non-leap years. Matot and Masei are read separately only in leap years when the preceding gate was 1.)
  - In Israel, chametz cannot be consumed on the day after Passover because it cannot be purchased on the Sabbath or Yom Tov.
  - In the diaspora, the usual Torah reading of the eighth day of Passover (Deuteronomy 15:19–16:17) is extended to its length on Shemini Atzeret (Deuteronomy 14:22–16:17) to accommodate the seven readings on the Sabbath.
- Vayehi Noam, Psalm 91, V'Ata Kadosh and the "verses of blessing" are recited on the expiry of Passover in the Diaspora, due to it coinciding with the Sabbath.
- Yom HaZikaron is advanced from Thursday to Wednesday, and Yom Ha'atzmaut is advanced from Friday to Thursday, so that the celebrations of Independence day do not continue into Shabbat.
- The 17th of Tammuz falls on Saturday. Since fasts other than Yom Kippur are not observed on Saturday, this is observed on the following Sunday.
- Multiple leniencies are made for Tisha B'Av:
  - Tisha B'Av falls on Saturday. Since fasts other than Yom Kippur are not observed on Saturday, this is observed on the following Sunday.
  - No restrictions are added to the Seudah HaMafseket immediately preceding the fast. However, eating must cease by sunset.
  - Those who are exempt from fasting must make havdalah before eating. Those who hear said recitation of havdalah on the day of the fast do not have to do so immediately following the fast.
  - If a circumcision is held on the day of the fast, the mohel, the sandak and the parents of the baby may eat after midday.
  - If a firstborn son is redeemed on the day of the fast, the Kohen and the father of the baby may eat after midday.
  - Almost all restrictions of the Nine Days expire immediately after the fast, with the exceptions of eating meat and drinking wine which are postponed until the following morning. (Some also add the restriction of listening to music.)
- Although havdalah after Shabbat Chazon is postponed to Sunday night due to Tisha B'Av, the blessing on the candle is recited in the synagogue before the reading of the Book of Lamentations.
- Vayehi Noam, Psalm 91 and the "verses of blessing" are not recited at Maariv on Tisha B'Av, despite it immediately following the Sabbath. Ein Mipi Bein Uvat, a special kinah mourning the loss of the recitation of Vayehi Noam, is recited instead. (V'Ata Kadosh is recited at Maariv on Tisha B'Av even on weeknights.)
- Rosh Chodesh Elul falls on Saturday and Sunday. Some congregations substitute the usual haftarah of Re'eh with that of Rosh Chodesh, while others do not to avoid interrupting the seven haftarot of consolation between Tisha B'Av and Rosh Hashanah (although some of those add the first and last verses for Shabbat Rosh Chodesh and the eve of Rosh Chodesh).
  - Those who substitute the haftarah of Re'eh with that of Shabbat Rosh Chodesh append the haftarah of Re'eh to that of Ki Teitzei (as they follow each other in the Book of Isaiah).
- If the previous gate was 3 or 4, this is a leap year.
  - In this case, no parshiot are doubled-up in Israel during the year (Tishrei-Elul). This is also the only case in which, in communities which read the haftarah for Shabbat Hagadol every year, Tzav's proper haftarah is read in Jerusalem (outside Jerusalem, it is also read when gate 4 is a leap year).
- If the previous gate was 1, this is not a leap year; and, Vayakhel-Pekudei are doubled up. This is the only year following Gate 1 in which this occurs.
- If both Cheshvan and Kislev have 29 days, then Hanukkah will begin on Sunday. This is the only occurrence in which the eve of Hanukkah begins on the Sabbath.
- If both Cheshvan and Kislev have 30 days, then the 30th of Kislev (which is also the first day of Rosh Chodesh Tevet) will fall on Saturday. Since this is also during Hanukkah, three Torah scrolls are used for the Sabbath morning Torah reading: one for Miketz, another for Rosh Chodesh, and a third for Hanukkah.
- If both Cheshvan and Kislev have 29 days, then Rosh Chodesh Shevat and Tu Bishvat will occur on Saturday. This means that on Rosh Chodesh Shevat, two Torah scrolls are used for the Sabbath morning Torah reading: one for Va'eira and one for Rosh Chodesh.

=== Gate 4 (11.5%) ===
- No Jewish holidays fall on Friday, therefore the eruv tavshilin is never prepared at any time during the year.
- Rosh Chodesh Adar (or Adar II) occurs on Saturday. Three Torah scrolls are used for the Sabbath morning Torah reading: one for Mishpatim or Terumah (Pekudei in leap years), another for the Rosh Chodesh reading, and a third for Parshat Shekalim.
- Purim falls on Friday, and the Purim feast is held earlier in the day due to the approaching Sabbath. In Jerusalem, where Purim always occurs a day later, the observances are spread out over Friday, Saturday, and Sunday (a "three-day Purim").
- If this is a non-leap year and the previous gate was 1, Vayakhel and Pekudei are not doubled up; this is the only non-leap year in which this occurs.
- The Fast of the Firstborn is held on the Thursday before Passover (the 12th of Nisan).
- Bedikat Chametz occurs on the night of the 13th of Nisan (Thursday night). Chametz is burned on the following Friday morning, but may be consumed throughout this day and up until Saturday morning, at which time any remaining chametz is flushed.
- During Saturday morning on the eve of Passover, two meals are customarily consumed early in the morning in order to fulfill the mitzvah of Seudah Shlishit before the fourth halachic hour, when chametz can no longer be consumed.
- In Israel, this is the only occasion in which the phrase HaPesachim Umin HaZubachim (as opposed to the usual HaZubachim Umin HaPesachim) is said prior to the drinking of the second cup during the Passover Seder, due to the Seder occurring on Saturday night. (Due to yom tov sheni shel galuyot, this is also recited in the diaspora in Gate 3.)
- No day of Chol HaMoed Passover coincides with the Sabbath. Song of Songs, which is usually read on the Sabbath of Chol HaMoed, is thus read on the seventh day of Passover in both Israel and the diaspora.
- The last two days of Passover fall on Saturday and Sunday in the Diaspora. This is the only case in which the pre-Mussaf song Kah Keili is neither recited on Yom Tov nor yom tov sheni shel galuyot (the first due to the Sabbath and the second due to Yizkor).
- Vayehi Noam, Psalm 91, V'Ata Kadosh and the "verses of blessing" are recited on the expiry of Passover in Israel, due to it coinciding with the Sabbath.
- As the last day of Passover (when the shehecheyanu blessing is not recited) falls on Sunday in the Diaspora, this is the only case in which havdalah concludes the Yom Tov kiddush.
- Yom HaZikaron is advanced two days from Friday to Wednesday, and Yom Ha'atzmaut is advanced two days from Saturday to Thursday, so that one does not mourn on the eve of Shabbat and so that the celebrations of Independence Day do not continue into Shabbat.
- Rosh Chodesh Av occurs on Saturday. Some congregations substitute the usual haftarah of Masei with that of Rosh Chodesh, while others do not to avoid interrupting the three haftarot of admonition during the Three Weeks (although some add the first and last verses for Shabbat Rosh Chodesh).
- Multiple leniencies are made for Tisha B'Av:
  - There is no "week in which Tisha B'Av occurs" as a level of mourning prior to the start of the fast.
  - No restrictions are added to the Seudah HaMafseket immediately preceding the fast. However, eating must cease by sunset.
  - Those who are exempt from fasting must make havdalah before eating. Those who hear said recitation of havdalah on the day of the fast do not have to do so immediately following the fast.
- Although havdalah after Shabbat Chazon is postponed to Sunday night due to Tisha B'Av, the blessing on the candle is recited in the synagogue before the reading of the Book of Lamentations.
- Vayehi Noam, Psalm 91 and the "verses of blessing" are not recited at Maariv on Tisha B'Av, despite it immediately following the Sabbath. Ein Mipi Bein Uvat, a special kinah mourning the loss of the recitation of Vayehi Noam, is recited instead. (V'Ata Kadosh is recited at Maariv on Tisha B'Av even on weeknights.)
- Rosh Chodesh Elul falls on Sunday and Monday. Unlike other times, the haftarah of Re'eh is not substituted with that of the eve of Rosh Chodesh to avoid interrupting the seven haftarot of consolation between Tisha B'Av and Rosh Hashanah (although some add the first and last verses of that of the eve of Rosh Chodesh).
- If the previous gate was 2, this is not a leap year and Tetzaveh does not coincide with Shabbat Zachor; this is the only non-leap year in which this occurs and when Tetzaveh's proper haftarah is read.
  - This does not apply in Jerusalem, as Tetzaveh coincides with Shushan Purim.
- If the previous gate was also 1 and this is a leap year, the following occur:
  - Vayakhel is read as it does not coincide with Parshat Shekalim. (Parshat Shekalim instead coincides with Pekudei as mentioned above.) This is one of three cases in which Vayakhel's proper haftarah is read. (The others are during a Gate 1-1 leap year and during Gate 2 on the last day of Hanukkah when both Cheshvan and Kislev have 30 days.)
  - Outside of Jerusalem due to Shushan Purim, Tzav's proper haftarah is read.
  - Pinechas falls on 16 Tammuz (meaning that its proper haftarah is read), and Matot and Masei are read separately. This also means that there are no doubled-up parshiot during the year (Tishrei-Elul).
- The first day of Rosh Chodesh Tevet falls on Saturday. Three Torah scrolls are used for the Sabbath morning Torah reading: one for Miketz, another for Rosh Chodesh, and a third for Hanukkah.

=== Next occurrence of each gate ===
Update when Purim comes around during the year with the next occurrence of either gate.

- Gate 1 (Thursday Rosh Hashanah): 2028
- Gate 2 (Saturday Rosh Hashanah): 2027
- Gate 3 (Monday Rosh Hashanah): 2029
- Gate 4 (Tuesday Rosh Hashanah): 2045

== See also ==
- Yom Chol

== Sources ==
- Shulchan Aruch, Orach Chaim 428:1
- The Complete Artscroll Siddur
