= Eudemus =

Eudemus (Ancient Greek: Εὔδημος, Eudēmos) may refer to:

- Eudemus of Cyprus (died 353 BC), a political exile from Cyprus and friend of Aristotle, after whom Aristotle's dialogue Eudemus, or On the Soul was named: see Corpus Aristotelicum#Fragments
- Eudemus of Rhodes (c. 370-300 BC), philosopher and student of Aristotle
- Eudemus (general) (died 316 BC), general of Alexander the Great
- Eudemus (physician), any of several Greek physicians, 4th century BC–2nd century AD
- Eudemus of Pergamum, 3rd century BC teacher of Philonides of Laodicea and dedicatee of Book 2 of Apollonius of Perga's Conics
- Eudemus of Pergamum (2nd century BC), implicated in the enmity between Tiberius Gracchus and Q. Pompeius
- Eudemus of Argos, 2nd century AD author of On Rhetorical Language (Περὶ λέξεων ῥητορικῶν), perhaps an important source of the Suda
- Avdimi of Haifa, hebraized form of Ancient Greek: Εὔδημος, Eudēmos, an Amora of the late 3rd/early 4th century AD
- Eudemus, Bishop of Patara (Lycia), 4th century AD
- Eudemos, the name of two Catholicoi of the Catholicate of Abkhazia (16th and 17th centuries)
- Eudemos I, of the Diasamidze family, Catholicos of Kartli in the 1630s

== See also ==
- Eudemis
