= Rav Avira =

Rav Avira (Hebrew: רב עוירא) was an Amora of the Land of Israel of the third and fourth generation of the Amoraic era.

== Biography ==
He was a pupil of R. Yochanan bar Nafcha, and a colleague of R. Abbahu. He is cited in the Talmud debating halakha with R. Yochanan bar Nafcha, and as a colleague of R. Abbahu and R. Helbo, he was also the pupil of R. Yochanan bar Nafcha.

He was a contemporary of Abaye and Safra—the latter speaking of him as of "a scholar coming from the West" (Palestine). Avira had emigrated to Palestine, where he officiated as usher at a college of "the great teacher" (probably Ammi); but he returned to his native land, bringing with him many halakhot and aggadot of Rabbi Ammi and of Rabbi Assi, in transmitting which he frequently interchanged the names of the authors.

One should distinguish between him and R. Avira who transmitted teachings in the name of Rava.

== Teachings ==
Besides those which he reported in the names of others, there are some original homilies by Rav Avira.

Once he said (some ascribe this to R. Eleazar): "Come and see how unlike human nature is the nature of the Holy One. The man of high standing looks up with respect to a man higher placed than himself, but does not respect his inferior; not so the Holy One: He is supreme and yet respects the lowly, as Scripture says, 'Though the Lord is high, yet has He respect for the lowly'".

According to Avira (some ascribe the remark to R. Joshua ben Levi): "The tempter [evil inclination] is called by seven different names. The Holy One—blessed be He!—calls him simply 'Evil,' as it is said, 'The inclination of man's heart is evil'. Moses calls him 'The uncircumcised,' for he says, 'You shall circumcise the foreskin of your heart'. David calls him 'impure,' for he prays, 'Create in me a pure heart,' from which it appears that there is an impure one. Solomon calls him 'Enemy,' for he says, 'If your enemy be hungry, give him bread [religious nourishment] to eat; and if he be thirsty, give him water [spiritual refreshment] to drink...' Isaiah calls him 'Stumbling-block,' for he cries, 'Remove the stumbling-block out of the way of my people'. Ezekiel calls him 'Stone,' for he says, 'I will remove the heart of stone out of your flesh, and will give you a heart of flesh'. Joel calls him 'Lurker,' for he says, 'I will remove far off from you the tzefoni' (which, in aggadah, is taken as a symbolic name of the tempter who lies hidden (tzafun) in the heart of man)."
