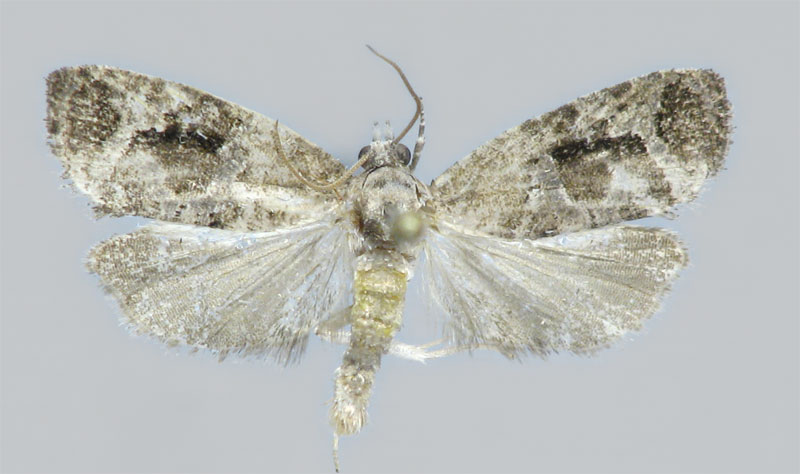

Scientific classification
- Domain: Eukaryota
- Kingdom: Animalia
- Phylum: Arthropoda
- Class: Insecta
- Order: Lepidoptera
- Family: Tortricidae
- Genus: Eudemis
- Species: E. porphyrana

Binomial name
- Eudemis porphyrana (Hübner, 1799)

Synonyms
- Tortrix porphyrana Hubner, [1796-1799]; Poecilochroma pomedaxana Pierce & Metcalfe, 1915; Eudemis porphyrana f. subnigra Gibeaux & Luquet, 1998; Eudemis porphyrana f. subpallida Gibeaux & Luquet, 1998

= Eudemis porphyrana =

Species of moth

Eudemis porphyrana is a moth of the family Tortricidae. It is found in most of Europe (except Iceland, Ireland, the Iberian Peninsula, the western part of the Balkan Peninsula, and Ukraine), east to the eastern part of the Palearctic realm.

The wingspan is 17–21 mm. Adults are on wing from June to August.

The larvae feed on Padus avium, Pyrus, Quercus, Salix caprea. It is sometimes considered a pest Malus, Prunus, Crataegus and Ribes. They roll a leaf of their host and feed within.
