= Eudemis brevisetosa =

Scientific classification
- Domain: Eukaryota
- Kingdom: Animalia
- Phylum: Arthropoda
- Class: Insecta
- Order: Lepidoptera
- Family: Tortricidae
- Genus: Eudemis
- Species: E. brevisetosa

Binomial name
- Eudemis brevisetosa Oku, 2005

Species of moth

Eudemis brevisetosa is a moth of the family Tortricidae. It is found in Japan (Honshu, Iwate Prefecture, Kuriyagawa, Morioka)

The wingspan is 15–19 mm.
