= Independence Day (Israel) =

Public holiday

Yom Ha'atzmaut יוֹם הָעַצְמָאוּת
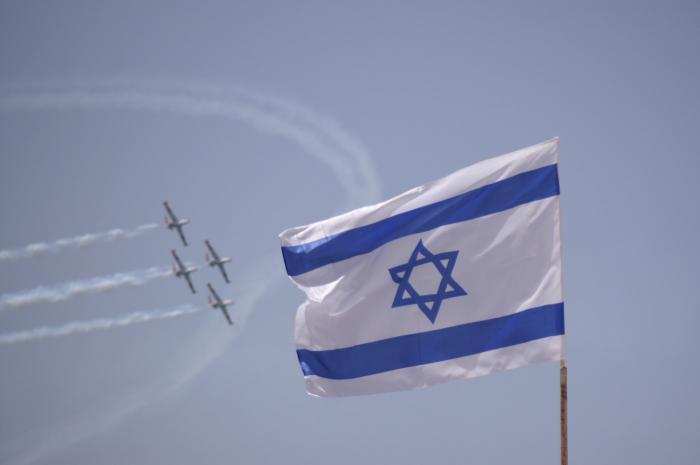
- Aerobatics display over Tel Aviv on Israel's 61st Independence Day, 2009
- Observed by: Israelis
- Celebrations: Family gatherings, firework displays, public celebrations (barbecues, picnics, concerts, etc.), religious services
- Observances: Mount Herzl memorial ceremonies, Lighting of the Twelve Torches, International Bible Contest, awarding of the Israel Prize to recipients, etc.
- Date: 5 Iyar (Hebrew calendar) (Note: This is the nominal date. The exact date depends the day of the week that the 5th of Iyar falls. See §Sabbath observance for additional details)
- 2025 date: Sunset, 30 April – nightfall, 1 May
- 2026 date: Sunset, 21 April – nightfall, 22 April
- 2027 date: Sunset, 11 May – nightfall, 12 May
- 2028 date: Sunset, 1 May – nightfall, 2 May
- Frequency: Annual
- Related to: Yom HaZikaron; Nakba Day

Yom Ha'atzmaut (Hebrew: יוֹם הָעַצְמָאוּת, Arabic: عيد الاستقلال, romanized: ʿīd al-istiqlāli, lit. 'Day of Independence') is Israel's national day, commemorating the Israeli Declaration of Independence on 14 May 1948. It is marked by a variety of official and unofficial ceremonies and observances.

Because Israel declared independence on 14 May 1948, which corresponded with the 5th of Iyar on the Hebrew calendar in that year, Yom Ha'atzmaut was originally celebrated on that date. However, to avoid Sabbath desecration, it may be commemorated one or two days before or after the 5th of Iyar if it falls too close to the Sabbath. The day preceding Israel's independence day is Yom HaZikaron, which is dedicated to the memory of fallen Israeli soldiers and Israeli civilian victims of terrorism.

In the Hebrew calendar, days begin in the evening; Yom Ha'atzmaut is observed from nightfall until the following evening of the designated day.

== History ==
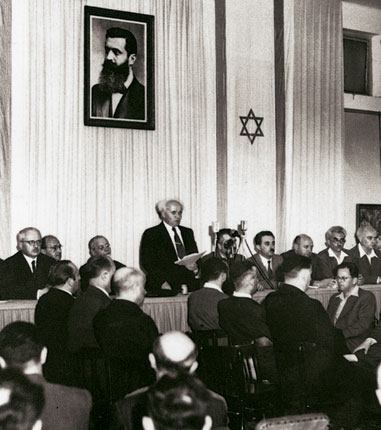
David Ben-Gurion proclaiming independence beneath a large portrait of Theodor Herzl, founder of modern Zionism.

Israelis observe Yom Ha'atzmaut to commemorate the Israeli Declaration of Independence, which was proclaimed by future Israeli prime minister David Ben-Gurion on behalf of the Yishuv on 14 May 1948. The mood outside of Ben-Gurion's residence just prior to the announcement was joyous:

The Jews of Palestine ... were dancing because they were about to realize what was one of the most remarkable and inspiring achievements in human history: A people which had been exiled from its homeland two thousand years before, which had endured countless pogroms, expulsions, and persecutions, but which had refused to relinquish its identity—which had, on the contrary, substantially strengthened that identity; a people which only a few years before had been the victim of mankind's largest single act of mass murder, killing a third of the world's Jews, that people was returning home as sovereign citizens in their own independent state.

The State of Israel was founded eight hours before the termination of the British Mandate for Palestine, which was due to finish on 15 May 1948.

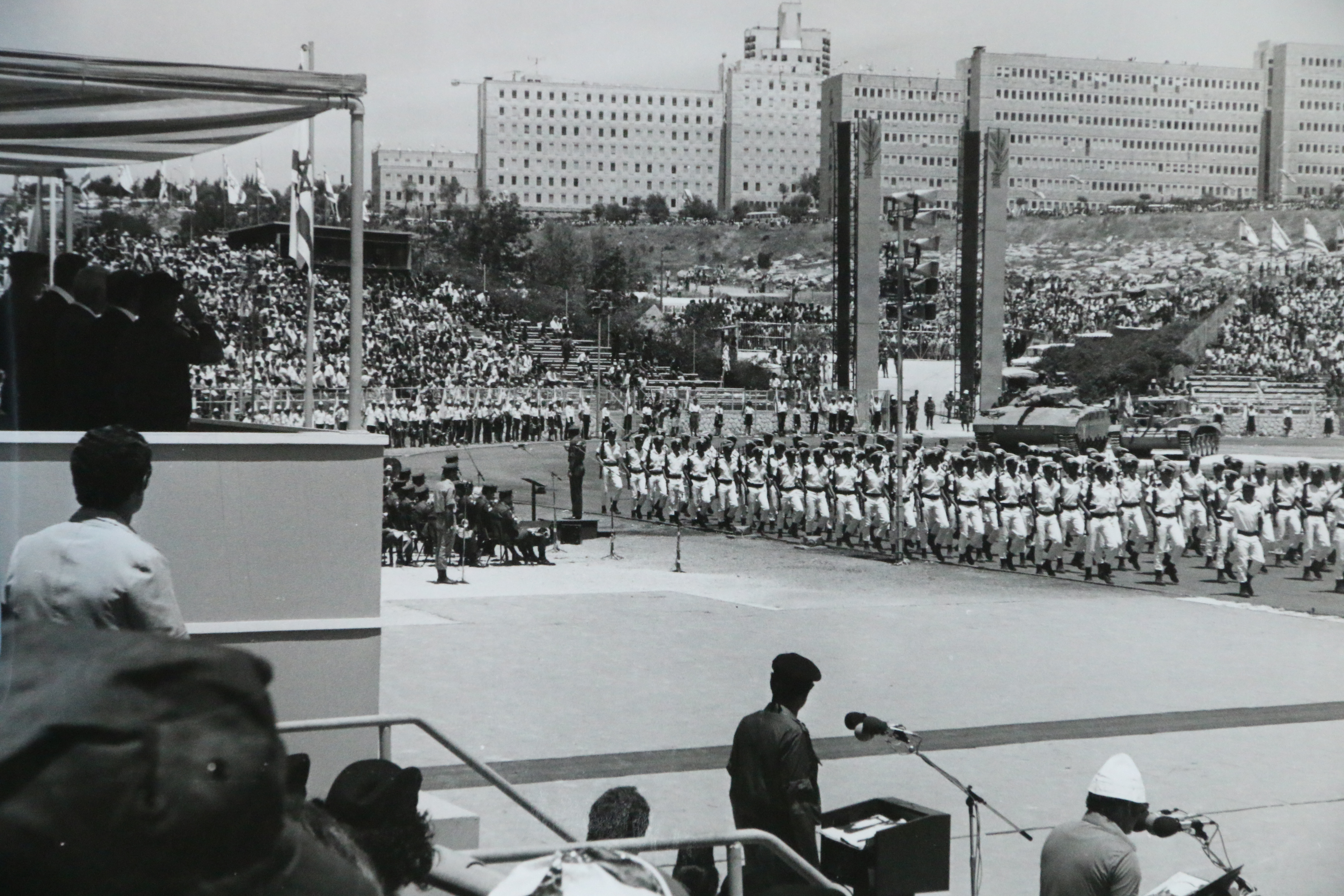
Independence Day, 1978

The operative paragraph of the Declaration of the Establishment of State of Israel of 14 May 1948 expresses the declaration to be by virtue of our natural and historic right and on the basis of the resolution of the United Nations General Assembly. The operative paragraph concludes with the words of Ben-Gurion, where he thereby declares the establishment of a Jewish state in Eretz Israel, to be known as the State of Israel.

While Israel was quickly granted diplomatic recognition by many countries, including the Soviet Union and the United States, it was not recognized by the Arab League and most Muslim-majority countries. On 15 May, Israel's neighbouring Arab countries declared war on it and invaded the territory of the former British Mandate, thus escalating the ongoing 1947–1948 civil war in Mandatory Palestine into the 1948 Arab–Israeli War. However, this war ended with an Israeli victory amidst the 1949 Armistice Agreements, which established the Green Line as Israel's de facto border until 1967.

== Events ==
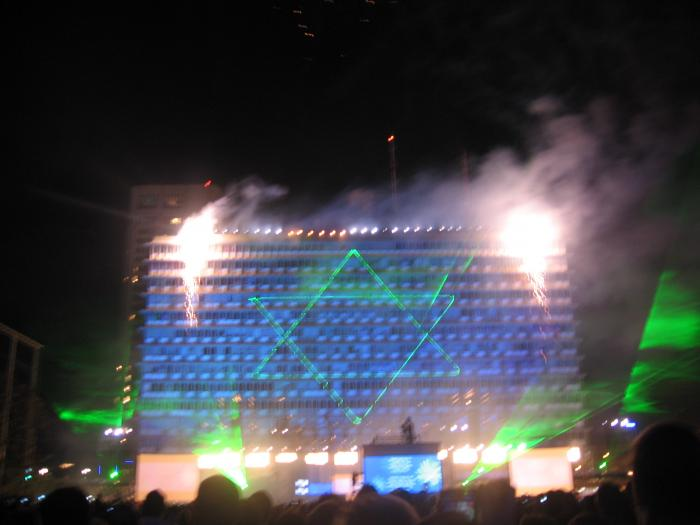
Independence Day celebrations in Tel Aviv's Rabin Square, 2008

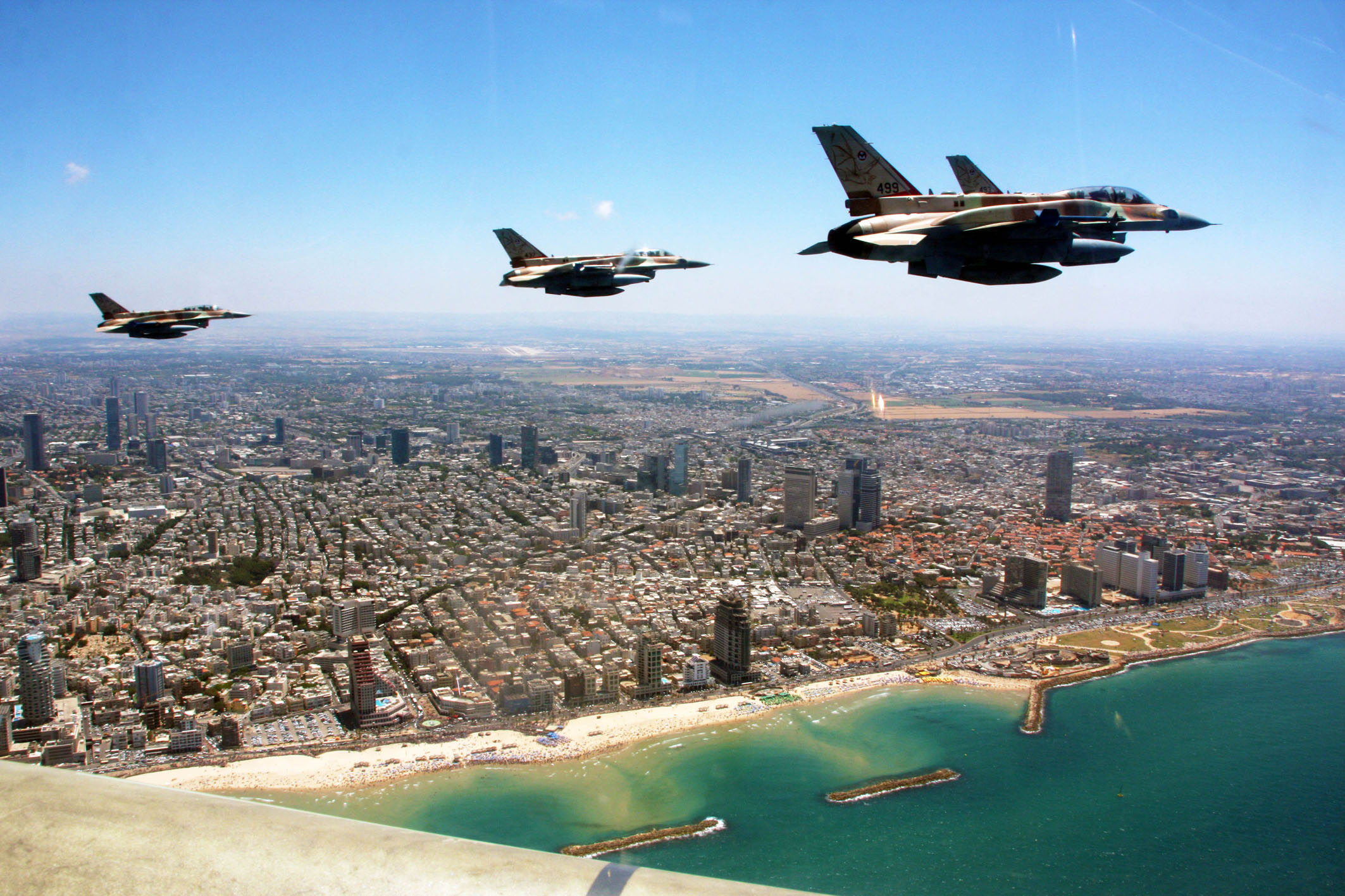
Israeli Air Force Independence Day flypast, 2011

=== Eve of Independence Day ===
Yom Hazikaron (Memorial Day), was established on 4 Iyar to mark the Kfar Etzion massacre, which took place the day before the State of Israel declared its independence. The day ends at sunset, and is immediately followed by the onset of Independence Day, given that in the Hebrew calendar system, days end and begin at sunset. The formal decision that the day of the Yom HaZikaron observance would take place back-to-back the day before Independence Day was made in 1963.

An official ceremony is held every year on Mount Herzl, Jerusalem, on the evening of Independence Day. The ceremony includes a speech by the speaker of the Knesset (the Israeli Parliament), artistic performances, a Flag of Israel, forming elaborate structures (such as a Menorah, Magen David) and the ceremonial lighting of twelve torches, one for each of the Tribes of Israel. Every year a dozen Israeli citizens, who made a significant social contribution in a selected area, are invited to light the torches. Many cities hold outdoor performances in cities' squares featuring leading Israeli singers and fireworks displays. Streets around the squares are closed to cars, allowing people to sing and dance in the streets.

=== Independence Day ===
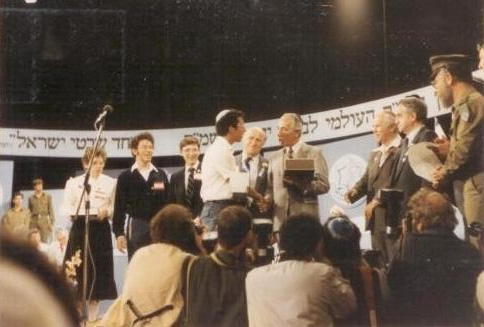
International Bible Contest, 1985

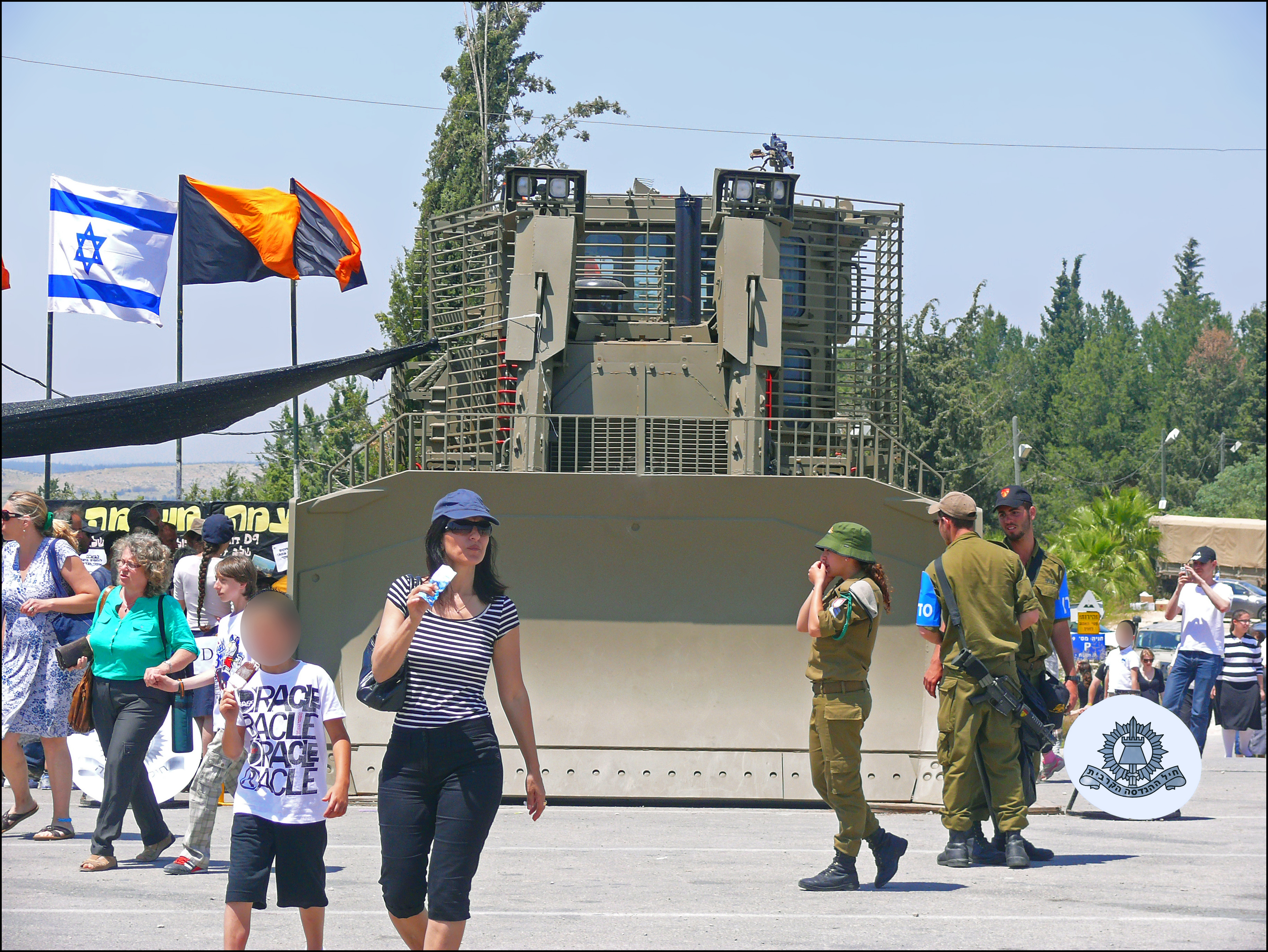
Visitors around an IDF Caterpillar D9 at the Israel Defense Forces exhibition at Yad La-Shiryon, Independence Day 2012.

- Reception of the President of Israel for honouring excellence in 120 IDF soldiers. The event takes place in the President's official residence in Jerusalem.
- International Bible Contest in Jerusalem.
- Israel Prize ceremony in Jerusalem.
- Israel Defense Forces opens some of its bases to the public.
- Israeli Song Festival

From 1948 to 1973 the Israel Defense Forces parade was held on this day.

Israeli families traditionally celebrate with picnics and barbecues. Balconies are decorated with Israeli flags, and small flags are attached to car windows. Some leave the flags hoisted until after Yom Yerushalayim. Israeli Television channels air the official events live, and classic cult Israeli movies and skits are shown.

=== Religious customs ===
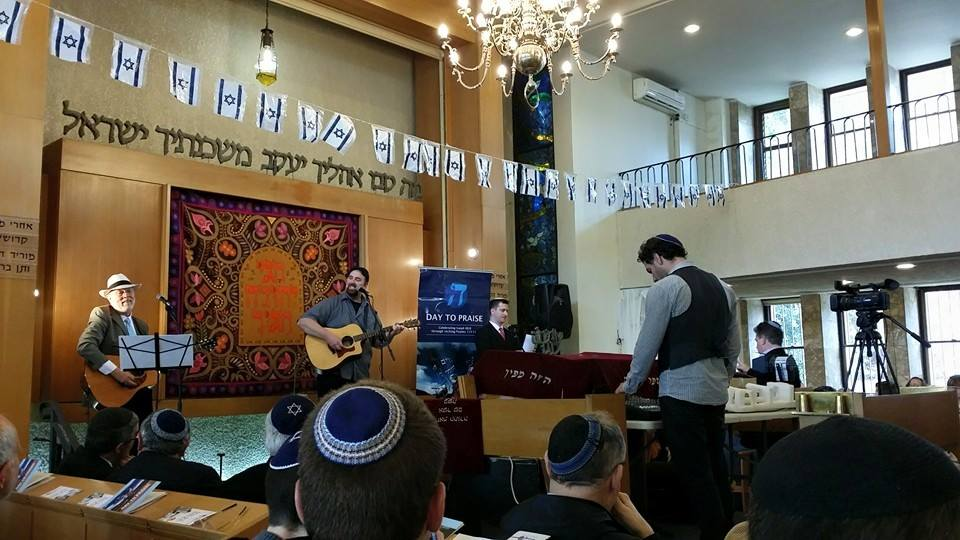
Hallel recited at the Day to Praise Israel Independence Day event in Jerusalem, 23 April 2015

In response to widespread public feeling, the Chief Rabbinate in Israel decided during 1950–51 that Independence Day should be given the status of a minor Jewish holiday on which Hallel be recited. Their decision that it be recited (without a blessing) gave rise to a bitter public dispute, with Agudath Israel rejecting the notion of imbuing the day with any religious significance whatsoever, and religious Zionists believing the blessing should be obligatory. The Rabbinate also ruled that they were "unable to sanction instrumental music and dances on this day which occurs during the sephirah period." The recitation of the blessing over Hallel was introduced in 1973 by Israeli Chief Rabbi Shlomo Goren. The innovation was strongly denounced by his Sephardic counterpart, Rabbi Ovadia Yosef and by Rabbi Joseph B. Soloveitchik, leader of Modern Orthodox Judaism in America.

The Religious Zionist movement created a liturgy for the holiday which sometimes includes the recitation of some psalms and the reading of the haftarah of Isaiah 10:32–12:6, which is also read on the last day of Pesach in the Diaspora, on the holiday morning. Other changes to the daily prayers include reciting Hallel, saying the expanded Pesukei D'Zimrah of Shabbat (the same practice that is observed almost universally on Hoshanah Rabbah), and/or blowing the Shofar. Rabbi Joseph Soloveitchik questioned the Halachic imperative in canonising these changes (it is not clear what his personal practice was regarding the recital of Hallel). In any case, the majority of his students recite Hallel without the blessings. A number of authorities have promoted the inclusion of a version of Al Hanisim (for the miracles...) in the Amidah prayer. In 2015 Koren Publishers Jerusalem published a machzor dedicated to observance of Independence Day, in addition to Jerusalem Day.

Most Haredim make no changes in their daily prayers. People affiliated to the Edah HaChareidis mourn the establishment of Israel on Independence Day, claiming that the establishment of a Jewish state before the coming of the Messiah is a sin and heresy. Some even fast on this day and recite prayers for fast days.

The Conservative Movement read the Torah portion of Deuteronomy 7:12–8:18, and include a version of Al Hanisim as well as recite full Hallel with the blessings. The Reform Movement suggests the inclusion of Ya'aleh V'yavo in the Amidah prayer.

In 2015, Rabbi Shlomo Riskin of Efrat founded Day to Praise, a global initiative which calls on Christians around the world to join in reciting the Hallel (Psalms 113–118), with the Jewish people, on Israel's Independence Day.

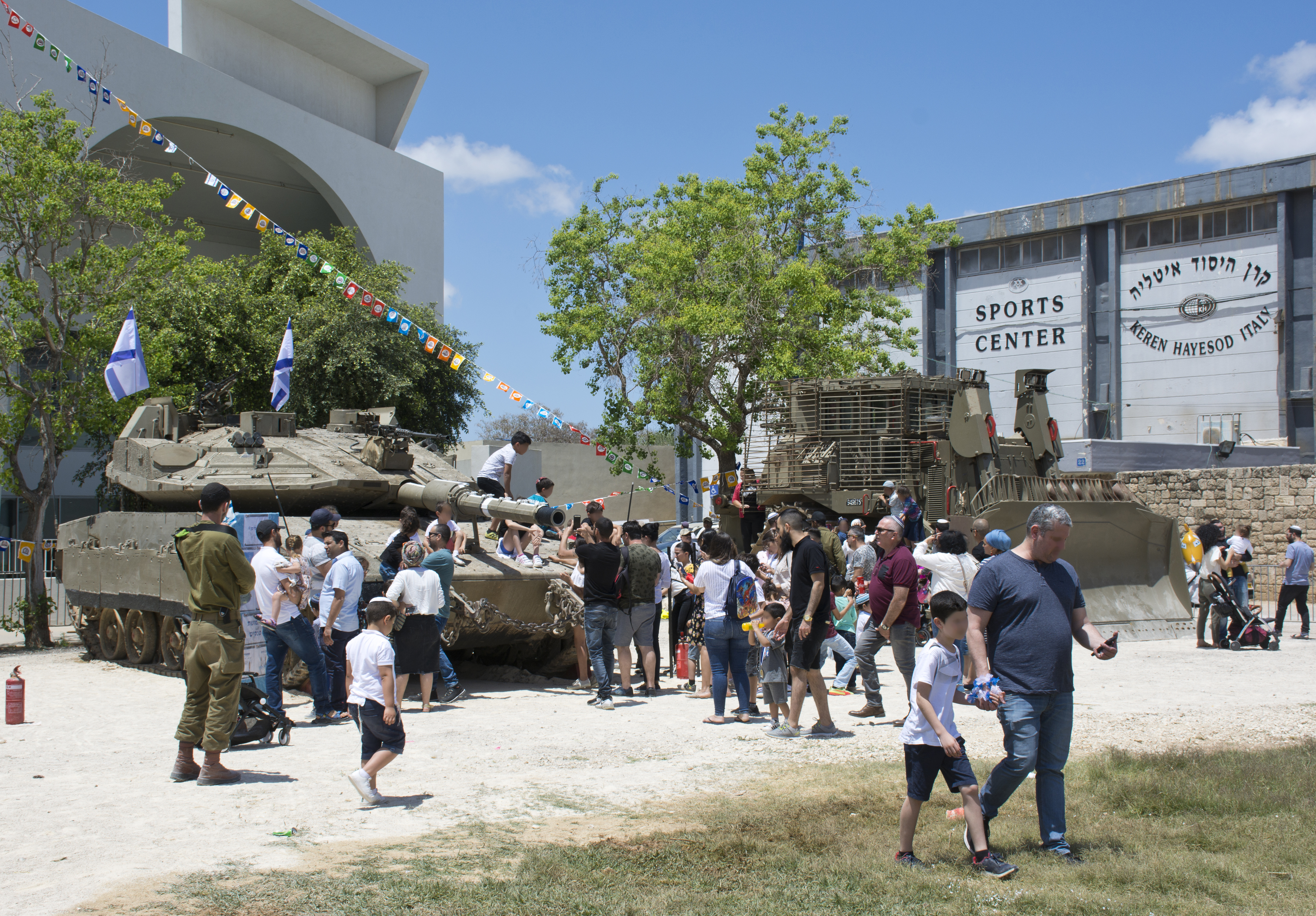
Families celebrating in Israel Defense Force fair in Sderot, 2019

== Timing ==
Independence Day is designated to be on the 5th day of Iyar (ה' באייר) in the Hebrew calendar, the anniversary of the day on which Israeli independence was proclaimed, when David Ben-Gurion publicly read the Israeli Declaration of Independence. The corresponding Gregorian date was 14 May 1948.

=== Sabbath observance ===
In order to avoid conflicts with the Jewish Sabbath, Independence Day is rarely celebrated on the 5th of Iyar itself, and on most years is celebrated a day or two before or after. According to the rules of the Jewish calendar explained in Days of week on Hebrew calendar, the 5th of Iyar can fall on a Monday, a Wednesday, a Friday, or a Saturday. To avoid Sabbath desecration, it was decided in 1951 that if the 5th of Iyar falls on a Friday or Saturday, the celebrations would be moved up to the preceding Thursday (3 or 4 of Iyar). Additionally, since 2004, if the 5th of Iyar is on a Monday, the festival is postponed to Tuesday (6 of Iyar). Monday is avoided in order to avoid potential violation of Sabbath laws by preparing for Yom Hazikaron (which is one day before Independence Day) on a Shabbat. As a result, Independence Day falls between 3 and 6 of Iyar, and can be on a Tuesday, Wednesday, or Thursday. Consequently, the holiday is celebrated on the 5th of Iyar only in years in which the date happens to fall on a Wednesday.

Upcoming Gregorian dates for Independence Day:

- Sunset, 11 May 2027 – nightfall, 12 May 2027
- Sunset, 1 May 2028 – nightfall, 2 May 2028
- Sunset, 18 April 2029 – nightfall, 19 April 2029
- Sunset, 7 May 2030 – nightfall, 8 May 2030

== Israeli Arabs ==
While some Israeli Arabs celebrate Yom Ha'atzmaut, others regard it as a tragic day in their history, and refer to it as the Nakba ("the catastrophe") marking the displacement of Palestinians and the loss of homes and lands in 1948. Since Yasser Arafat declared in 1998 an annual Nakba Day to be observed on May 15, some Israeli Arabs have been commemorating Nakba Day instead of Yom Ha'atzmaut. Nakba Day and Yom Ha'atzmaut rarely fall on the same day, but fall within a few weeks of each other.
