= Eudemis centritis =

Scientific classification
- Kingdom: Animalia
- Phylum: Arthropoda
- Class: Insecta
- Order: Lepidoptera
- Family: Tortricidae
- Genus: Eudemis
- Species: E. centritis

Binomial name
- Eudemis centritis (Meyrick, 1912)

Synonyms
- Argyroploce centritis Meyrick, 1912

Species of moth

Eudemis centritis is a moth of the family Tortricidae. It is found in India and Vietnam.
