= Avdimi of Haifa =

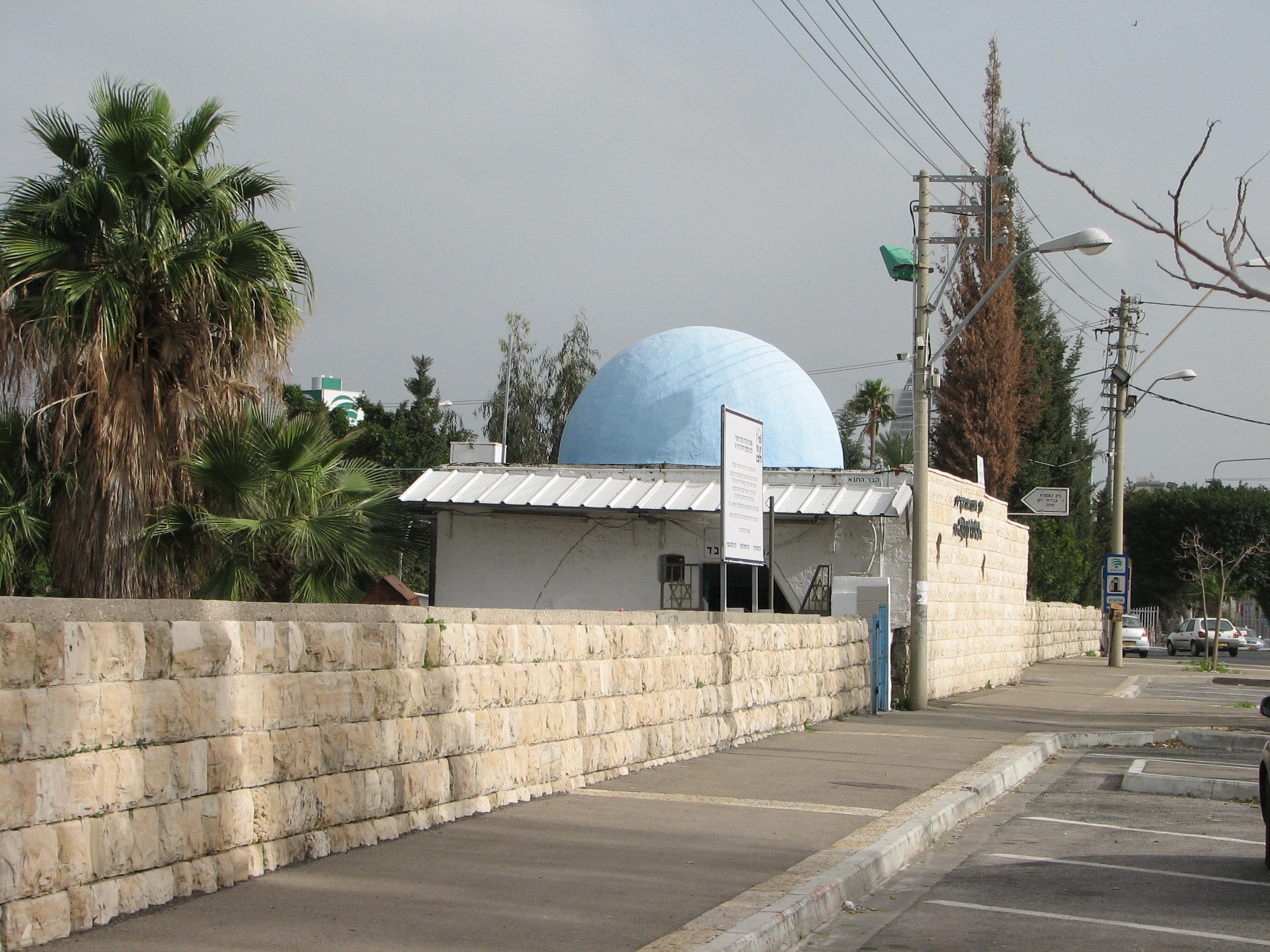
Tomb of Avdimi of Haifa, Haifa, Israel

Avdimi of Haifa (Hebrew: אבדימי דמן חיפה, translit: Avdimi d'min Haifa; in the Jerusalem Talmud: אבדומה ד'חיפה, translit: Avduma d'Haifa; hebraized form of Ancient Greek: Εὔδημος, Eudēmos) was among the greatest of the amoraim of Eretz Israel who flourished during the 3rd and 4th centuries.

He was a student of Levi ben Sisi and Resh Lakish and his pupils included Rabbi Abbahu, Rav Zeira and Rabbi Helbo.

His traditional burial place lies in the ancient Jewish cemetery in Haifa, on Yaffa Street. Travelers and pilgrims from the Middle Ages noted his grave site.

== Teachings ==
He was a recognized authority in halakhic matters, prominent contemporaries as well as successors citing his views in support of their own. He was also distinguished in aggadah.

According to him, this rule of etiquette should be observed: When a scholar (hakham) passes to take his seat at college, one should rise in his honor within a distance of four cubits, and remain standing till he has passed to a like distance. In honor of a vice-president of the Sanhedrin (av beit din), one should rise as soon as one perceives him coming, and remain standing until he has passed to a distance of four cubits; but when the president of the Sanhedrin (nasi) passes, one should rise as soon as one observes him approaching, and remain standing long enough for him to reach his place and be seated; for thus the Bible says, "All the people stood up . . . and looked after Moses, until he was gone into the tent".

Commenting on Ecclesiastes 12:7, "And the spirit shall return to God who gave it," the famous aggadist, R. Samuel ben Nahman remarked that R. Avdima of Haifa thus illustrates this passage: "A priest who was a chaver (i.e. who was strict in observing the laws of purity), entrusted a sacred loaf of terumah to one less strict (Am ha'aretz), saying, 'Behold, I am clean, and my house is clean, and my utensils are clean, and this loaf is clean: if you will return it to me in the condition in which I hand it to thee, well and good; if not, I shall burn it in thy presence.' Thus says the Holy One—blessed be He!—to man, 'Behold, I am pure, and My mansion is pure, and My ministers are pure, and the soul which I give into thy keeping is pure: if thou wilt return it to Me as I give it to thee, it shall be well; otherwise, I shall burn it in thy presence'".

=== Quotes ===
- With the destruction of the First Temple, the gift of prophecy was taken from the prophets and bestowed upon the learned.
- Before man eats and drinks he has two hearts; after he eats and drinks he has but one.
