= Matot =

Portion of Torah

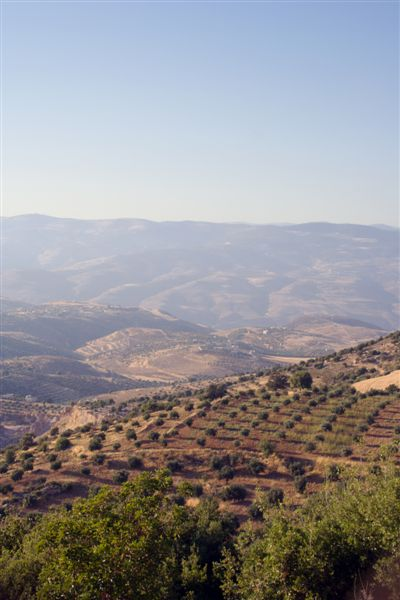
The hills of Gilead (current day Jal'ad, Jordan)

Matot, Mattot, Mattoth, or Matos (מַּטּוֹת—Hebrew for "tribes", the fifth word, and the first distinctive word, in the parashah) is the 42nd weekly Torah portion (פָּרָשָׁה, parashah) in the annual Jewish cycle of Torah reading and the ninth in the Book of Numbers. It comprises Numbers 30:2–32:42. It discusses laws of vows, the destruction of Midianite towns, and negotiations of the Reubenites and Gadites to settle land outside of Israel.

The parashah is made up of 5,652 Hebrew letters, 1,484 Hebrew words, 112 verses, and 190 lines in a Torah Scroll (סֵפֶר תּוֹרָה, Sefer Torah). Jews generally read it in July or early August. The lunisolar Hebrew calendar contains up to 55 weeks, the exact number varying between 50 in common years and 54 or 55 in leap years. In some leap years (for example, 2014), parashah Matot is read separately. In most years (all coming years until 2035 in both the Diaspora and Israel), parashah Matot is combined with the next parashah, Masei, to help achieve the number of weekly readings needed.

== Readings ==
In traditional Sabbath Torah reading, the parashah is divided into seven readings, or עליות, aliyot.

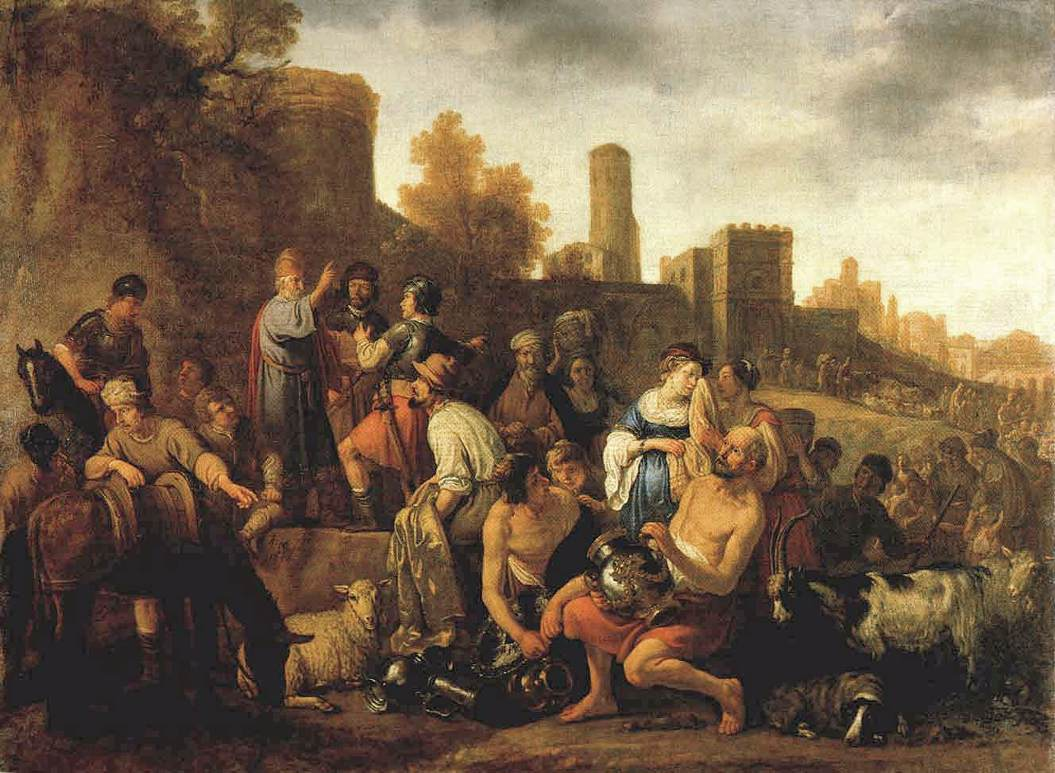
Moses Ordering the Slaughter of the Midianites (1650 painting by Claes Corneliszoon Moeyaert)

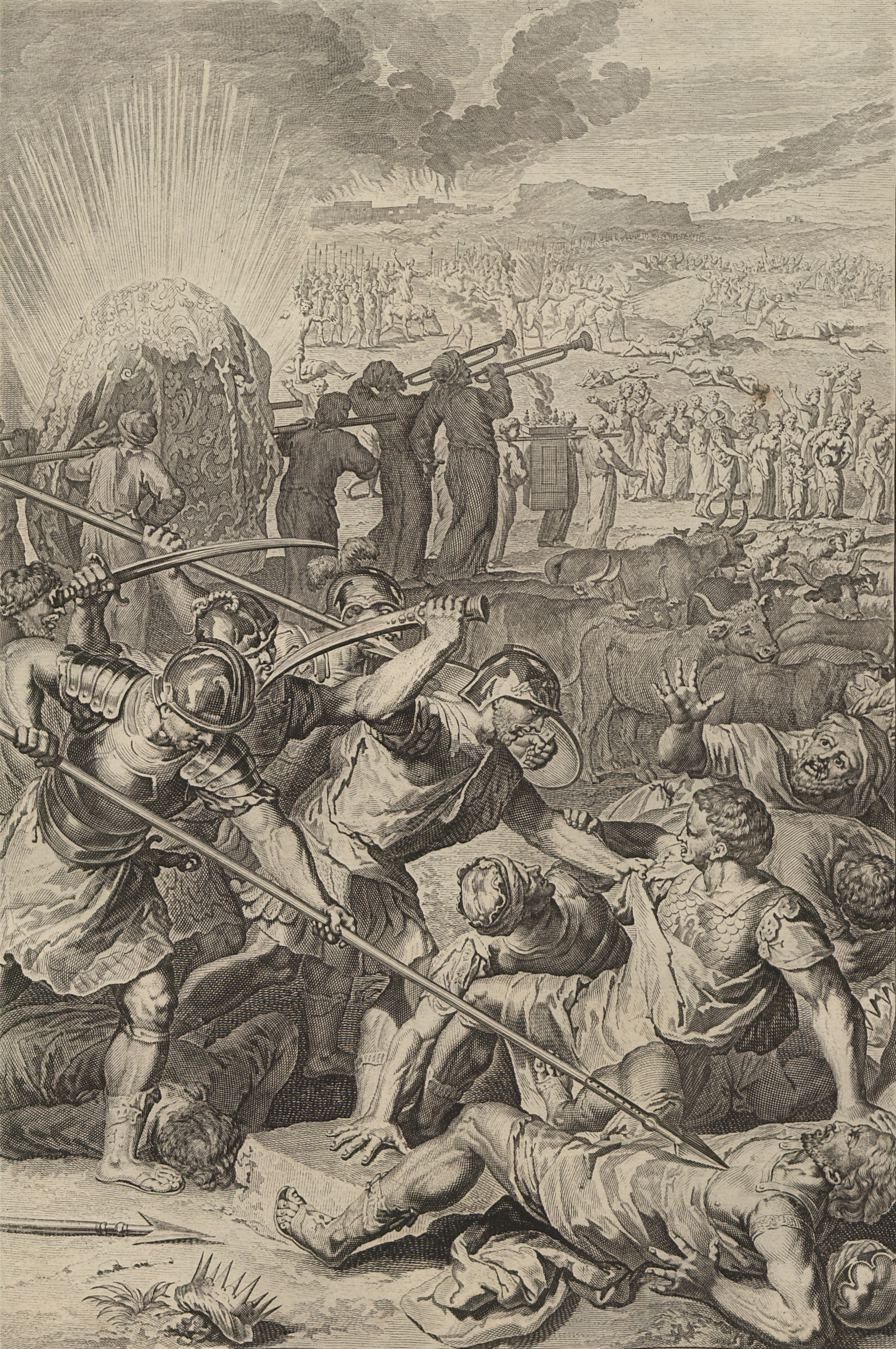
Five Kings of Midian Slain by Israel (illustration from the 1728 Figures de la Bible)

=== First reading—Numbers 30:2–17 ===
In the first reading, Moses told the heads of the Israelite tribes God's commands about commitments (נדרים, nedarim, commonly translated, or some say mistranslated, as "vows"). If a man made a vow to God, he was to carry out all that he promised. If a girl living in her father's household made a vow to God, and her father learned of it and did not object, her vow would stand. But if her father objected on the day that he learned of it, her vow would not stand, and God would forgive her. If she married while her vow was still in force, and her husband learned of it and did not object on the day that he found out, her vow would stand. But if her husband objected on the day that he learned of it, her vow would not stand, and God would forgive her. The vow of a widow or divorced woman was binding. If a married woman made a vow and her husband learned of it and did not object, then her vow would stand. But if her husband objected on the day that he learned of it, her vow would not stand, and God would forgive her. If her husband annulled one of her vows after the day that he learned of it, he would bear her guilt.

=== Second reading—Numbers 31:1–12 ===
In the second reading, God directed Moses to attack the Midianites, after which he would die. At Moses' direction, a thousand men from each tribe, with Phinehas son of Eleazar serving as priest on the campaign with the sacred utensils and trumpets, attacked Midian and slew every man, including five kings of Midian and the prophet Balaam. The Israelites burned the Midianite towns, took the Midianite women and children captive, seized all their beasts and wealth as booty, and brought the captives and spoil to Moses, Eleazar, and the Israelite community at the steppes of Moab.

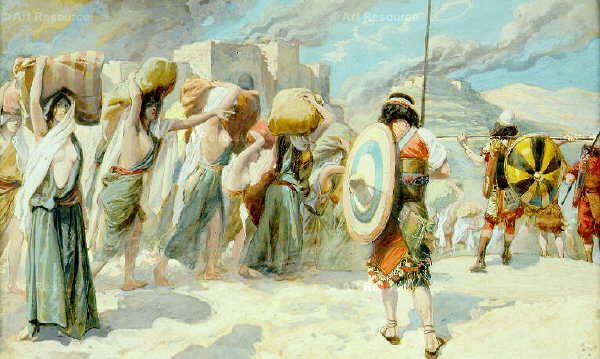
The Women of Midian Led Captive by the Hebrews (watercolor by James Tissot)

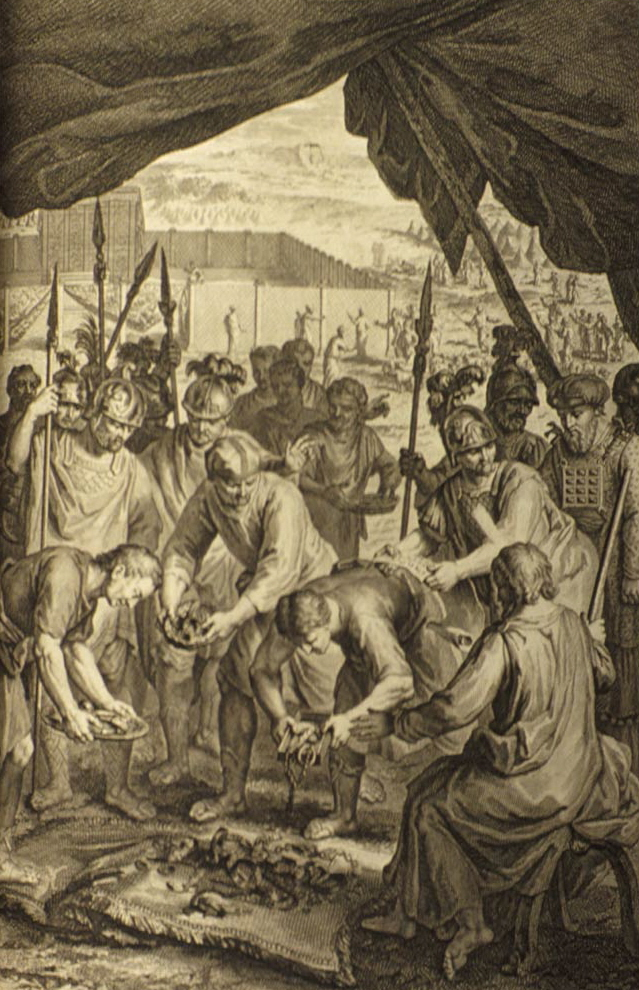
The Oblation Out of the Spoils of the Midianites (illustration from the 1728 Figures de la Bible)

=== Third reading—Numbers 31:13–24 ===
In the third reading (עליה, aliyah), Moses became angry with the army's commanders for sparing the women, as they were the ones who, at Balaam's bidding, had induced the Israelites to trespass against God in the sin of Peor. Moses then told the Israelites to kill every boy and every woman who had had sexual relations, but to spare the virgin girls. Moses directed the troops to stay outside the camp for 7 days after that, directed every one of them who had touched a corpse to cleanse himself on the third and seventh days, and directed them to cleanse everything made of cloth, hide, or wood. Eleazar told the troops to take any article that could withstand fire—gold, silver, copper, iron, tin, and lead—and pass them through fire to clean them, and to cleanse everything with the water of lustration. Eleazar directed that on the seventh day they should wash their clothes and be clean, and thereafter be free to enter the camp.

=== Fourth reading—Numbers 31:25–41 ===
In the fourth reading (עליה, aliyah), God told Moses to work with Eleazar and the family heads to inventory and divide the booty equally between the combatants and the rest of the community. God told them to exact a levy for God of one item in 500 of the warriors' captive persons and animals to be given to Eleazar, and one in every 50 of the other Israelites' captive persons and animals to be given to the Levites. The total booty came to 675,000 sheep, 72,000 head of cattle, 61,000 donkeys, and 32,000 virgin women, which Moses and Eleazar divided as God had commanded.

=== Fifth reading—Numbers 31:42–54 ===
In the fifth reading (עליה, aliyah), the Israelites' half of the booty came to 337,500 sheep, 36,000 head of cattle, 30,500 donkeys, and 16,000 virgin women, which Moses and Eleazar divided as God had commanded:

Division of the Midianite Spoils
Type of Spoils	Total Booty	Warrior Share	Eleazar's Portion	Congregation's Share	Levites' Portion
Sheep	675,000	337,500	675	337,500	6,750
Cattle	72,000	36,000	72	36,000	720
Donkeys	61,000	30,500	61	30,500	610
Persons	32,000	16,000	32	16,000	320

The commanders of the troops told Moses that they had checked the warriors, and not one was missing, so they brought as an offering to God the gold that they came upon—armlets, bracelets, signet rings, earrings, and pendants—to make expiation for their persons before God. Moses and Eleazar accepted from them 16,750 shekels of gold, but the warriors in the ranks kept their booty for themselves.

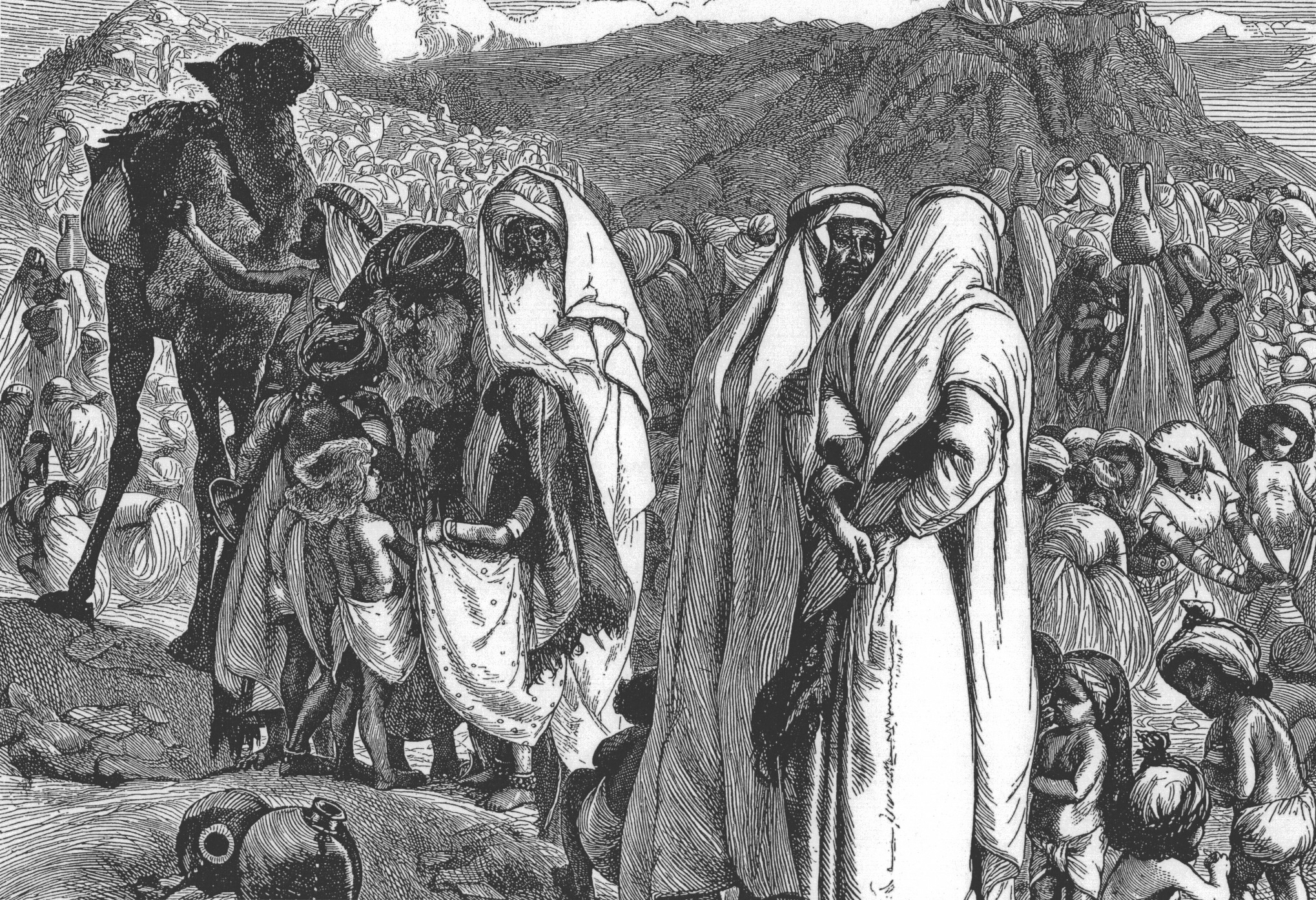
Reuben and Gad Ask for Land (engraving by Arthur Boyd Houghton)

=== Sixth reading—Numbers 32:1–19 ===
In the sixth reading (עליה, aliyah), the Reubenites and the Gadites, who owned much cattle, noted that the lands of Jazer and Gilead on the east side of the Jordan River suited cattle, and they approached Moses, Eleazar, and the chieftains and asked that those lands be given to them as a holding. Moses asked them if the rest of the Israelites were to go to war while they stayed on the east bank, and would that not undermine the enthusiasm of the rest of the Israelites for crossing into the Promised Land. Moses likened their position to that of the scouts who surveyed the land and then turned the minds of the Israelites against invading, thus incensing God and causing God to swear that none of the adult Israelites (except Caleb and Joshua) would see the land. They replied that they would build their sheepfolds and towns east of the Jordan and leave their children there, but then serve as shock-troops in the vanguard of the Israelites until the land was conquered and not seek a share of the land west of the Jordan.

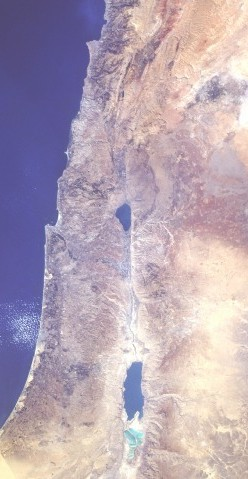
In this satellite image, the Jordan River appears near the center as a vertical line connecting the Sea of Galilee on the north with the Dead Sea on the south.

=== Seventh reading—Numbers 32:20–42 ===
In the seventh reading (עליה, aliyah), Moses then said that if they would do this, and every shock-fighter among them crossed the Jordan, then they would be clear before God and Israel, and this land would be their holding. But Moses continued, if they did not do as they promised, they would have sinned against God. Moses instructed Eleazar, Joshua, and the family heads of the Israelite tribes to carry out the agreement. So Moses assigned the Gadites, the Reubenites, and half the tribe of Manasseh lands on the east side of the Jordan. The Gadites and Reubenites built cities on the east side of Jordan, and some leaders of Manasseh conquered cities on the east of the Jordan so half the tribe of Manasseh could settle there.

=== Readings according to the triennial cycle ===
Jews who read the Torah according to the triennial cycle of Torah reading read the parashah according to a different schedule.

== In inner-biblical interpretation ==
The parashah has parallels or is discussed in these Biblical sources:

=== Numbers chapter 31 ===
Vows, discussed in Numbers 30:2–17, also appear in Genesis 28:20–22, Numbers 21:2, Judges 11:30–40, 1 Samuel 1:11; 14:24. Deuteronomy 23:22, 24 and Ecclesiastes 5:3 echo the admonition of Numbers 30:3 that those who make vows must keep their word. And Deuteronomy 23:23 and Ecclesiastes 5:4 counsel that one does better by not vowing altogether.

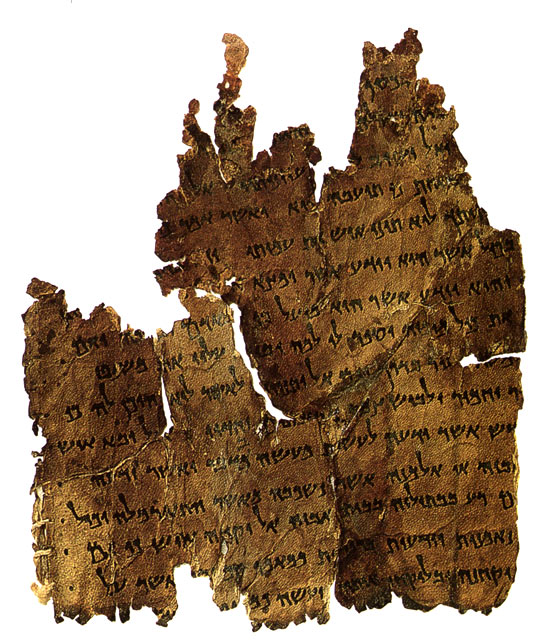
A Damascus Document Scroll found at Qumran

== In early nonrabbinic interpretation ==
The parashah has parallels or is discussed in these early nonrabbinic sources:

=== Numbers chapter 30 ===
The Damascus Document of the Qumran community prohibited a man from annulling an oath about which he did not know whether or not it should be carried out.

== In classical rabbinic interpretation ==
The parashah is discussed in these rabbinic sources from the era of the Mishnah and the Talmud:

=== Numbers chapter 30 ===
Tractates Nedarim and Shevuot in the Mishnah, Tosefta, Jerusalem Talmud, and Babylonian Talmud interpreted the laws of vows and oaths in Exodus 20:7, Leviticus 5:1–10 and 19:12, Numbers 30:2–17, and Deuteronomy 23:24.

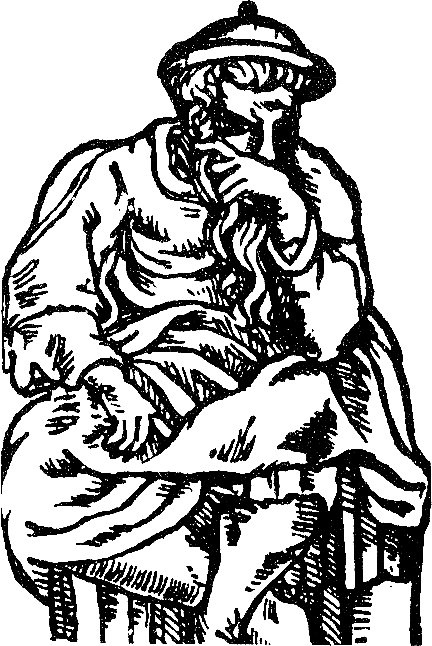
Rabbi Akiva (illustration from the 1568 Mantua Haggadah)

The Mishnah taught that saying any substitute for the formulas of a vow has the validity of a vow. If one says to another, "I am barred from you by a vow," or, "I am separated from you," or, "I am removed from you, in respect of anything that I might eat of yours or that I might taste of yours," the one vowing is prohibited. Rabbi Akiva was inclined to give a stringent ruling when a person says, "I am banned to you." The Gemara taught that a vow (נֶדֶר, neder) makes a thing forbidden to a person, while an oath (שְׁבֻעָה, shevuah) binds a person to a relationship to a thing.

Rabbi Akiva taught that vows are a fence for self-restraint. But the Jerusalem Talmud asked whether it was not enough that the Torah had forbidden us things that we should seek to forbid yet other things to ourselves. The Gemara discouraged vows. Rabbi Nathan taught that one who vows is as if he built a high place, and he who fulfils a vow is as if he sacrificed on that high place. And the Gemara deduced from Rabbi Nathan's teaching that it is meritorious to seek absolution from vows. And a midrash told the tale of King Jannai, who owned two thousand towns, all of which were destroyed because of true oaths. A man would swear to his friend that he would eat such-and-such a food at such-and-such a place and drink such-and-such a drink at such-and-such a place. And they would go and fulfill their oaths and would be destroyed (for swearing to trifles). The midrash concluded that if this was the fate of people who swore truthfully, how much more would swearing to a falsehood lead to destruction.

The Jerusalem Talmud reasoned that Numbers 30:2 notes that "Moses spoke to the heads of the tribes" to teach that a head of a tribe—that is an expert Sage—can dissolve a vow.

Reasoning from Numbers 30:3, "He shall not profane his word," the Tosefta concluded that one should not treat one’s words as profane and unconsecrated. Even though there were vows that the Rabbis had ruled were not binding, the Tosefta taught that one should not make even such a vow with the plan of annulling it, as Numbers 30:3 says, "He shall not profane his word." The Tosefta also deduced from Numbers 30:3 that even a sage could not annul his own vow for himself.

The Mishnah taught that the law of the dissolution of vows hovers in the air and has nothing on which to rest in the Biblical text. Rav Judah said that Samuel found the Scriptural basis for the law of the dissolution of vows in the words of Numbers 30:3, "he shall not break his word," which teaches that "he"—the vower—may not break the vow, but others might dissolve it for him. The Rabbis taught in a baraita that a Sage could annul a vow retroactively.

The Sifre asked why Numbers 6:1–4 set forth the effectiveness of nazirite vows, when the general rule of Numbers 30:3 would suffice to teach that all vows—including nazirite vows—are binding. The Sifre explained that Numbers 6:1–4 warned that a person making a nazirite vow would be bound to at least a 30-day nazirite period.

Rabbah bar bar Hana told of how an Arab merchant took him to see Mount Sinai, where he saw scorpions surround it, and they stood like white donkeys. Rabbah bar bar Hana heard a Heavenly Voice expressing regret about making an oath and asking who would annul the oath. When Rabbah bar bar Hana came before the Rabbis, they told him that he should have annulled the oath. But Rabbah bar bar Hana thought that perhaps it was the oath in connection with the Flood, where in Genesis 8:21, God promised never to destroy the world again with another flood. The Rabbis replied that if that had been the oath, the Heavenly Voice would not have expressed regret.

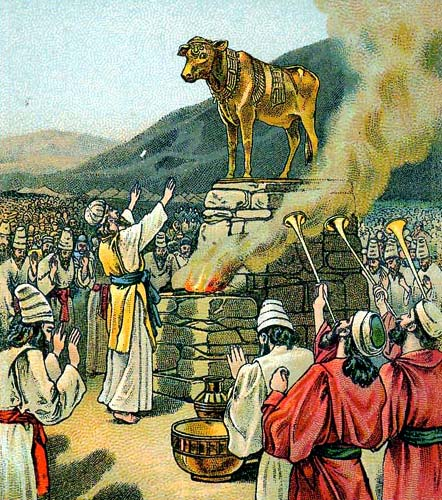
Worshiping the Golden Calf (illustration from a Bible card published 1901 by the Providence Lithograph Company)

Rava employed Numbers 30:3 to interpret Exodus 32:11, which says: "And Moses besought (וַיְחַל, va-yechal) the Lord his God" in connection with the incident of the Golden Calf. Rava noted that Exodus 32:11 uses the term "besought" (וַיְחַל, va-yechal), while Numbers 30:3 uses the similar term "break" (יַחֵל, yacheil) in connection with vows. Transferring the use of Numbers 30:3 to Exodus 32:11, Rava reasoned that Exodus 32:11 meant that Moses stood in prayer before God until Moses annulled for God God's vow to destroy Israel, for a master had taught that while people cannot break their vows, others may annul their vows for them. Similarly, Rabbi Berekiah taught in the name of Rabbi Helbo in the name of Rabbi Isaac that Moses absolved God of God's vow. When the Israelites made the Golden Calf, Moses began to persuade God to forgive them, but God explained to Moses that God had already taken an oath in Exodus 22:19 that "he who sacrifices to the gods ... shall be utterly destroyed," and God could not retract an oath. Moses responded by asking whether God had not granted Moses the power to annul oaths in Numbers 30:3 by saying, "When a man vows a vow to the Lord or swears an oath to bind his soul with a bond, he shall not break his word," implying that while he himself could not break his word, a scholar could absolve his vow. So Moses wrapped himself in his cloak and adopted the posture of a sage, and God stood before Moses as one asking for the annulment of a vow.

Rabbi Simeon ben Yohai taught that just as the texts "He shall not break his word" in Numbers 30:3 and "Defer not to pay it" in Ecclesiastes 5:3 apply to vows, so they also apply to valuations, and thus Moses exhorts the Israelites in Leviticus 27:2: "When a man shall clearly utter a vow of persons to the Lord, according to your valuation . . . ."

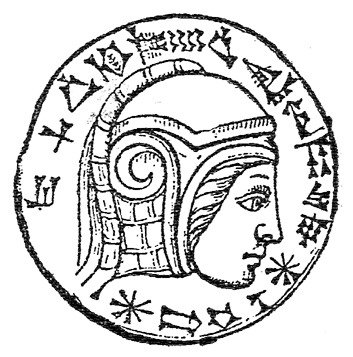
Nebuchadnezzar II

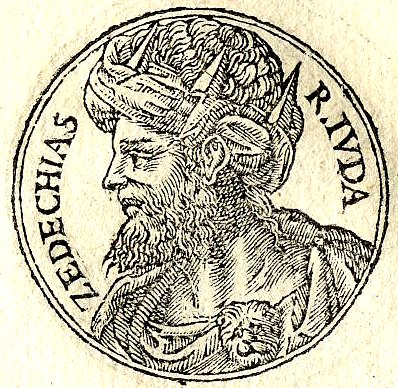
Zedekiah

Rabbi Eleazar interpreted Lamentations 2:10 to teach that one should not treat Numbers 30 lightly, because on account of it were the members of the Great Sanhedrin of Zedekiah slain. When King Jeconiah of Judah was exiled, King Nebuchadnezzar of Babylon appointed Zedekiah King of Judah (as reported in 2 Kings 24:17). Zedekiah stood so high in King Nebuchadnezzar’s favor that he could enter and leave King Nebuchadnezzar’s presence without permission. One day, Zedekiah entered Nebuchadnezzar’s presence and found him tearing the flesh of a hare and eating it while it was still alive. Nebuchadnezzar asked Zedekiah to swear that he would not disclose this, and Zedekiah swore. Subsequently, the five kings over whom Nebuchadnezzar had appointed Zedekiah were sitting and sneering at Nebuchadnezzar in Zedekiah’s presence, and they told Zedekiah that the kingship did not belong to Nebuchadnezzar but to Zedekiah, as Zedekiah descended from David. So Zedekiah too sneered at Nebuchadnezzar and disclosed that once he saw him tear the flesh of a live hare and eat it. The five kings immediately told Nebuchadnezzar, who forthwith came to Antioch, where the members of the Great Sanhedrin went to meet him. Nebuchadnezzar asked them to expound the Torah to him, and they began to read it chapter by chapter. When they reached Numbers 30:3, "When a man vows a vow . . . he shall not break his word," Nebuchadnezzar asked them whether a person could retract a vow. They replied that such a person must go to a Sage to absolve the person of the vow. Nebuchadnezzar told them that they must have absolved Zedekiah of the oath that he swore to him, and he immediately ordered them to be placed on the ground, as Lamentations 2:10 reports, "They sit upon the ground, and keep silence, the elders of the daughter of Zion." To avail them in their peril, they then began to recount the merit of Abraham, who in Genesis 18:27 said, “I am but dust and ashes”; thus Lamentations 2:10 continues, “They have girded themselves with sackcloth.” They began to recount the merit of Jacob, of whom Genesis 37:34 says, “He put sackcloth upon his loins.” But Nebuchadnezzar caused the members of the Great Sanhedrin to have their hair bound to the tails of their horses as the horses were driven from Jerusalem to Lydda, killing the members of the Great Sanhedrin in the process. Thus Lamentations 2:10 continues, “the virgins of Jerusalem [referring to the members of the Great Sanhedrin] hang down their heads to the ground.”

Interpreting the law of vows in Numbers 30:3–6, the Mishnah taught that a young child's vows were not binding. When a girl turned 11 years old and throughout the year thereafter, they examined to determine whether she was aware of the significance of her vows. The vows of a girl 12 years old or older stood without examination. When a boy turned 12 years old and throughout the year thereafter, they examined to determine whether he was aware of the significance of his vows. The vows of a boy 13 years old or older stood without examination. For girls below age 11 or boys below age 12, even if they said that they knew in honor of Whose Name they vowed, their vows and dedications were not valid. After girls turned 12 or boys turned 13, even though they said that they did not know in the honor of Whose Name they vowed, their vows and dedications stood. The Sifri Zutta told that once a youth told Rabbi Akiva that the youth had dedicated a shovel. Rabbi Akiva asked the youth whether perhaps he had sanctified his shovel to the sun or the moon. The youth replied that Rabbi Akiva did not need to worry, as the youth had sanctified it to the One Who had created them. Rabbi Akiva told the youth that his vows were valid.

The Mishnah taught that a father who did not say anything to annul his daughter's vow because he did not know that he had the power to do so could release the vow when he learned that he did have that power. Similarly, the Sages taught that a father who did not know that a statement was a vow could release that vow when he learned that it was a vow (although Rabbi Meir said that he could not).

The Sifri Zutta taught that if a father annulled his daughter's vow without her knowing that he had done so, and she deliberately transgressed the vow, she was nonetheless not liable to penalty, because Numbers 30:6 says, “the Lord will forgive her.”

Reading Numbers 30:9, “But every vow of a widow and of a divorcee . . . shall be binding on her,” the Mishnah taught that if she said, “I will be a nazirite after thirty days,” even if she married within the thirty days, her husband could not annul her vow. And if she vowed on one day, divorced on the same day, and remarried on the same day, the husband could not annul her vow. The Mishnah stated the general rule: Once she had gone into her own domain even for a single hour, her husband could not annul her vows.

The Mishnah taught that a father or husband could annul vows of self-denial (which, in the words of Numbers 30:14, "afflict the soul"), such as bathing and adorning oneself. But Rabbi Jose said that these were not vows of self-denial. Rabbi Jose taught that vows of self-denial that a father or husband could annul include if she said, "konam (that is, prohibited) be the produce of the whole world to me." Rabbi Jose taught that if she said, "konam be the produce of this country to me," he could not annul, as he could bring her to a different country. And if she said, "konam be the fruits of this shopkeeper to me," he could not annul, unless that shopkeeper was his only source of sustenance, in which case he could annul.

The Gemara deduced from the words "between a man and his wife, between a father and his daughter" in Numbers 30:17 that in addition to vows of self-denial, a husband could also annul vows that affected the relationship between husband and wife.

A midrash taught that just as a husband could annul only vows that would cause personal affliction between the spouses, so too, a father could annul only vows that would cause personal affliction between him and his daughter.

The Mishnah taught that in the case of a betrothed young woman, her father and her fiancé could annul her vows, if they both did so. If her father but not her fiancé attempted to annul her vow, or if her fiancé but not her father attempted to annul her vow, it was not annulled. And the Mishnah taught that it went without saying that her vow was not annulled if one of them confirmed it.

The Mishnah taught that one could annul vows on the Sabbath.

=== Numbers chapter 31 ===
A midrash deduced from the proximity of the report in Numbers 31:9 that "the children of Israel took captive the women of Midian . . . and all their cattle" with the report of Numbers 32:1 that "the children of Reuben and the children of Gad had a very great multitude of cattle" that God cast the Midianites down before Israel so that the Reubenites and Gadites might grow rich. The midrash cited this turn of events as proof of the words of Psalm 32:1 that "God is judge; He puts down one, and lifts up another."

Noting that in Joshua 1:5, God told Joshua, "As I was with Moses, so I will be with you," the Rabbis asked why Joshua lived only 110 years (as reported in Joshua 24:29 and Judges 2:8) and not 120 years, as Moses did (as reported in Deuteronomy 34:7). The Rabbis explained that when God told Moses in Numbers 31:2 to "avenge the children of Israel of the Midianites; afterward shall you be gathered to your people," Moses did not delay carrying out the order, even though God told Moses that he would die thereafter. Rather, Moses acted promptly, as Numbers 31:6 reports: "And Moses sent them." When God directed Joshua to fight against the 31 kings, however, Joshua thought that if he killed them all at once, he would die immediately thereafter, as Moses had. So Joshua dallied in the wars against the Canaanites, as Joshua 11:18 reports: "Joshua made war a long time with all those kings." In response, God shortened his life by ten years.

The Rabbis differed about the meaning of "the holy vessels" in Numbers 31:6. Rabbi Johanan deduced from the reference of Exodus 29:29 to "the holy garments of Aaron" that Numbers 31:6 refers to the priestly garments containing the Urim and Thummim when it reports that "Moses sent . . . Phinehas the son of Eleazar the priest, to the war, with the holy vessels." But the midrash concluded that Numbers 31:6 refers to the Ark of the Covenant, to which Numbers 7:9 refers when it says, "the service of the holy things."

Assyrian Deportations of the Israelites

=== Numbers chapter 32 ===
A midrash deduced from Numbers 32:1 that the Reubenites and Gadites were rich, possessing large amounts of cattle, but they loved their possessions so much that they separated themselves from their fellow Israelites and settled outside the Land of Israel. As a result, they became the first tribes to be taken away into exile, as 1 Chronicles 5:26 reports, "Tillegath-pilneser king of Assyria ... carried ... away ... the Reubenites, and the Gadites, and the half-tribe of Manasseh."

The Tanna Devei Eliyahu taught that if you live by the commandment establishing the Sabbath (in Exodus 20:8) and Deuteronomy 5:12), then (in the words of Isaiah 62:8) "The Lord has sworn by His right hand, and by the arm of His strength: 'Surely I will no more give your corn to be food for your enemies.'" If, however, you transgress the commandment, then it will be as in Numbers 32:10–11, when "the Lord's anger was kindled in that day, and He swore, saying: 'Surely none of the men . . . shall see the land.'"

Similarly, a midrash taught that the Reubenites and the Gadites cherished their property more than human life, putting their cattle before their children when they told Moses in Numbers 32:16, "We will build sheepfolds here for our cattle, and cities for our little ones." Moses told them that their priorities were wrong and that they should rather do the more important things first, when Moses told them in Numbers 32:24, "Build you cities for your little ones, and folds for your sheep." The midrash saw in their different priorities application of the words of Ecclesiastes 10:2, "A wise man's understanding is at his right hand"—applying to Moses—and "A fool's understanding at his left"—applying to the Reubenites and the Gadites. God told the Reubenites and the Gadites that as they showed greater love for their cattle than for human souls, there would be no blessing in it for them. The midrash thus saw in their fate application of the words of Proverbs 20:21, "An estate may be gotten hastily at the beginning; but the end thereof shall not be blessed," and the words of Proverbs 23:4, "Do not weary yourself to be rich; cease from your own wisdom."

In the Mishnah, Rabbi Meir noted that Numbers 32:20 and 29 stated the same condition in both positive and negative formulations. Numbers 32:29 states the condition in the positive: "And Moses said to them, if the children of Gad and the children of Reuben will pass with you over the Jordan, . . . then you shall give them the land of Gilead for a possession." And Numbers 32:20 states the same condition in the negative: "But if they will not pass over with you armed, then they shall have possessions among you in the land of Canaan." Rabbi Meir deduced that every stipulation must be stated in both the negative and positive formulations, like the condition of the children of Gad and the children of Reuben in Numbers 32:20 and 29, or it is not a binding stipulation. Rabbi Hanina ben Gamaliel II maintained, however, that Moses stated the matter both ways because he needed to do so to be understood; otherwise one might have concluded that the Gadites and Reubenites would receive no inheritance even in the land of Canaan.

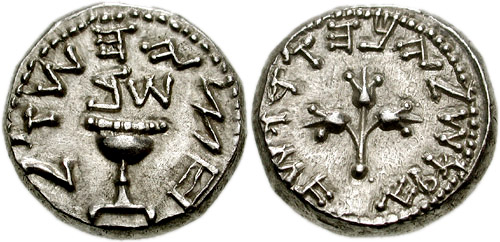
67–68 CE half-shekel coin

The Mishnah taught that those who removed from the Temple coins collected in the shekel tax could not enter the chamber wearing a bordered cloak or shoes or sandals or tefillin or an amulet, lest if they became rich people might say that they became rich from money in the chamber. The Mishnah thus taught that it is one’s duty to appear to be free of blame before others as before God, as Numbers 32:22 says: "And you shall be guiltless before the Lord and before Israel."

Similarly, the Tosefta cited Numbers 32:22, "You shall be clear before the Lord, and before Israel," to support the proposition that while out collecting charity, charity collectors were not permitted to separate their own money from that which they collected for charity by placing their own money in a separate purse, lest it appear that they were stealing for themselves some of the money that they gathered for charity. While collecting for charity, a charity collector could not take for personal use money from a friend who owed the charity collector money, and a charity collector could not take for personal use money that the charity collector found on the road.

The Sages taught in a baraita that they honored the memory of the family that baked the Temple showbread, for they never allowed fine bread to be found in their children's hands. And the Sages honored the memory of the family that made the Temple incense, for they never allowed a bride of their house to go about perfumed. In both cases, the families did so to fulfill the command of Numbers 32:22 that "you shall be clear before the Lord and before Israel"—meaning that people should act so as to avoid even the appearance of transgression.

== In medieval Jewish interpretation ==
The parashah is discussed in these medieval Jewish sources:

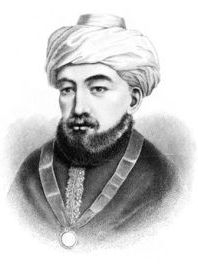
Moses Maimonides

=== Numbers chapter 32 ===
Maimonides read the admonition of Numbers 32:22, "You shall be blameless before God and before Israel," to counsel the community to take great care in the management of community's funds. Maimonides taught that those who deposited funds in the Temple treasury did not wear garments in which they could hide money, lest people suspect them of stealing the Temple's funds. People would talk to them continuously from when they entered the Temple until they left, so that they could not place coins in their mouths. Even with such safeguards, Maimonides taught that the community should not appoint a poor person or someone who craves money to manage its funds so as not to arouse suspicion, to fulfill Numbers 32:22, "You shall be blameless before God and before Israel."

== Commandments ==
=== According to Maimonides ===
Maimonides cited a verse in the parashah for one negative commandment:

- Not to transgress in matters that one has forbidden oneself

=== According to Sefer ha-Chinuch ===
According to Sefer ha-Chinuch, there is 1 positive and 1 negative commandment in the parashah.

- The precept of the law of nullifying vows
- That we should not break our word in vows that we make

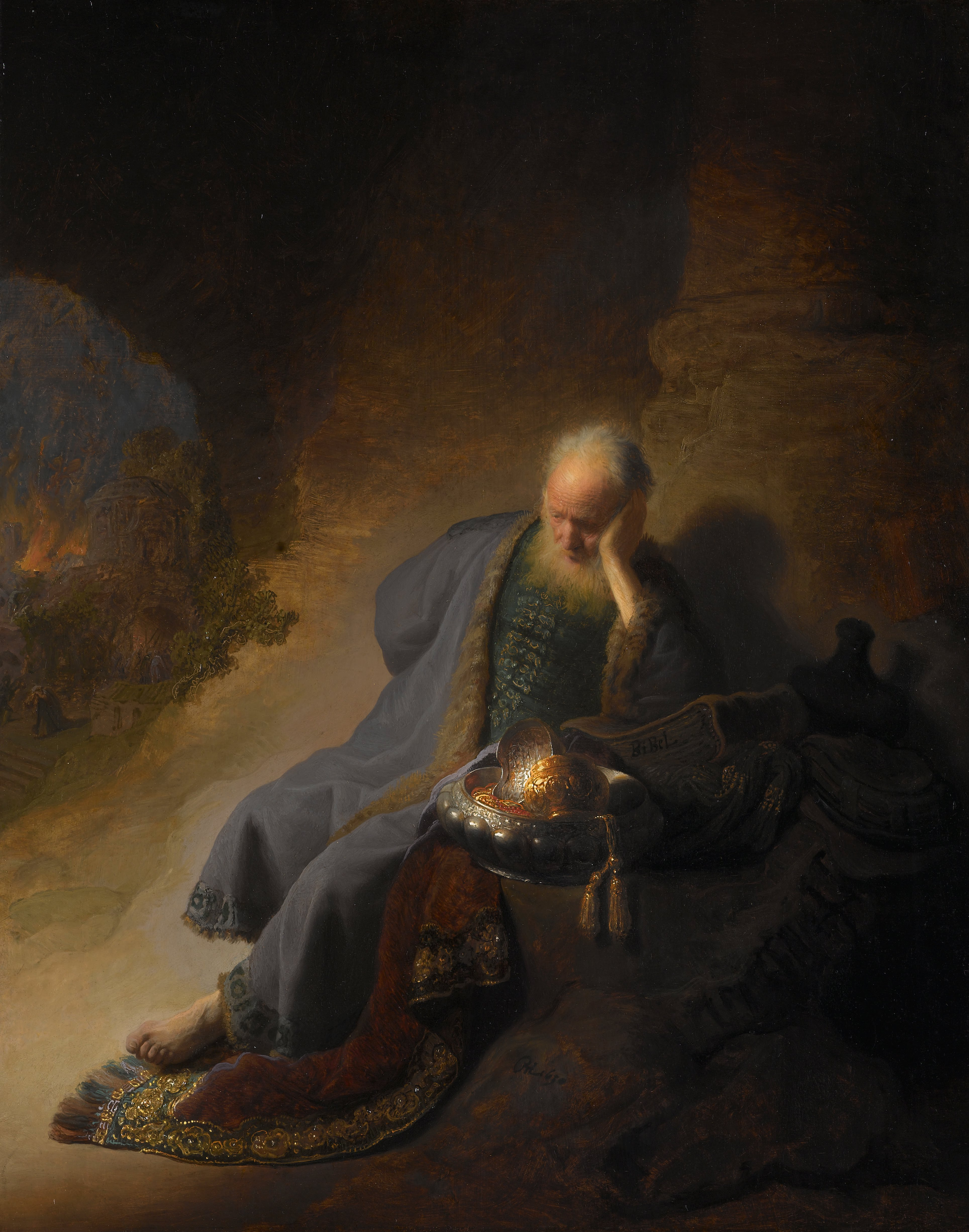
Rembrandt, Jeremiah Lamenting the Destruction of Jerusalem, c. 1630

== Haftarah ==
The haftarah for Parashat Matot is Jeremiah 1:1–2:3. The haftarah is the first of three readings of admonition leading up to Tisha B'Av.

When parashah Matot is combined with Parashat Masei (as it will be until 2035), the haftarah is the haftarah for Parashat Masei:

- for Ashkenazi Jews: Jeremiah 2:4–28 and 3:4.
- for Sephardi Jews: Jeremiah 2:4–28 and 4:1–2.

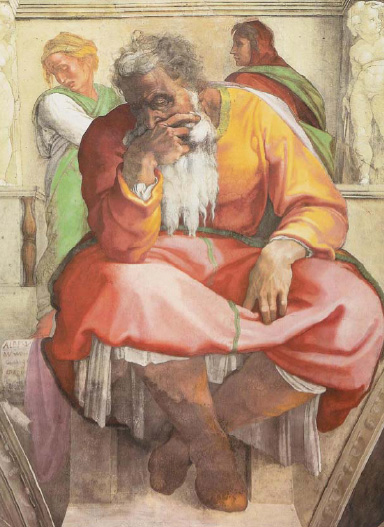
Jeremiah (fresco by Michelangelo)

=== Summary ===
The haftarah in Jeremiah 1:1–2:3 begins by identifying its words as those of Jeremiah the son of Hilkiah, a priest in Anathoth in the land of Benjamin, to whom God's word came in the thirteenth year of the reign of Josiah the son of Amon as king of Judah, in the reign of Josiah's son Jehoiakim, and through the eleventh year of the reign of Josiah's son Zedekiah, when Jerusalem was carried away captive.

God's word came to Jeremiah to say that before God formed him in the womb, God knew him, sanctified him, and appointed him a prophet to the nations. Jeremiah protested that he could not speak, for he was a child, but God told him not to fear, for he would go wherever God would send him, say whatever God would command him to say, and God would be with him to deliver him. Then God touched Jeremiah's mouth and said that God had put words in his mouth and set him over the nations to root out and to pull down, to destroy and to overthrow, to build and to plant. God asked Jeremiah what he saw, he replied that he saw the rod of an almond tree, and God said that he had seen well, for God watches over God's word to perform it.

God's word came to Jeremiah a second time to ask what he saw, he replied that he saw a seething pot tipping from the north, and God said that out of the north evil would break forth upon all Israel. For God would call all the kingdoms of the north to come, and they would set their thrones at Jerusalem's gate, against its walls, and against the cities of Judah. God would utter God's judgments against Judah, as its people had forsaken God and worshipped the work of their own hands. God thus directed Jeremiah to gird his loins, arise, and speak to the Judean people all that God commanded, for God had made Jeremiah a fortified city, an iron pillar, and brazen walls against the land of Judah, its rulers, its priests, and its people. They would fight against him, but they would not prevail, for God would be with him to deliver him.

God's word came to Jeremiah to tell him to go and cry in the ears of Jerusalem that God remembered the affection of her youth, her love as a bride, how she followed God in the wilderness. Israel was God's hallowed portion and God's first-fruits, and all that devoured Israel would be held guilty and evil would come upon them.

=== Connection to the special Sabbath ===
The first of three readings of admonition leading up to Tisha B'Av, the haftarah admonishes Judah and Israel in Jeremiah 1:13–19. And then in Jeremiah 2:1–3, the haftarah concludes with consolation. The Gemara taught that Jeremiah wrote the book of Lamentations, and as Jews read Lamentations on Tisha B'Av, this probably accounts for why a selection from Jeremiah begins the series of haftarot of admonition.
