= Eudemis gyrotis =

Scientific classification
- Kingdom: Animalia
- Phylum: Arthropoda
- Class: Insecta
- Order: Lepidoptera
- Family: Tortricidae
- Genus: Eudemis
- Species: E. gyrotis

Binomial name
- Eudemis gyrotis (Meyrick, 1909)

Synonyms
- Argyroploce gyrotis Meyrick, 1909

Species of moth

Eudemis gyrotis is a moth of the family Tortricidae. It is found in Vietnam, India, Japan and Taiwan.

It is a rather variable species.

The larvae feed on the leaves of Myrica rubra. They roll the leaves of their host plant.
