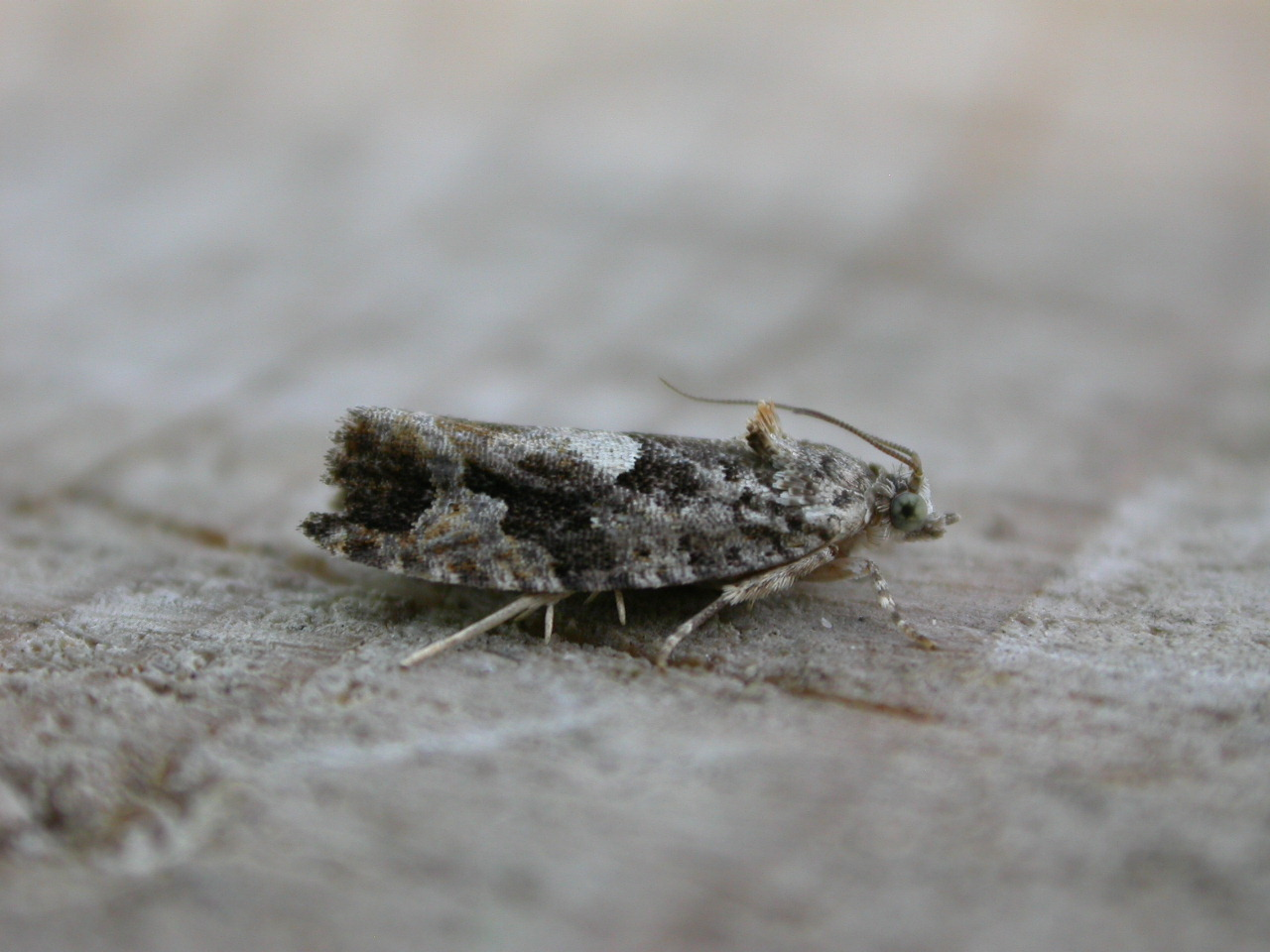
- Ventral view
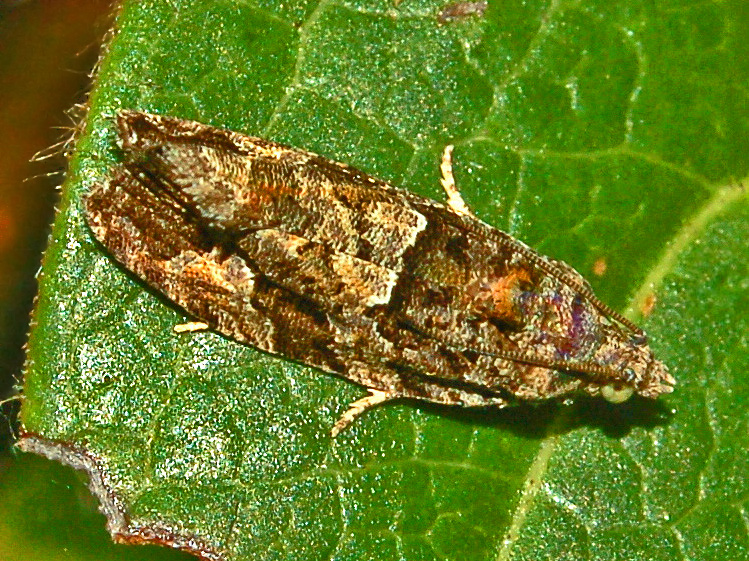
- Dorsal view

Scientific classification
- Domain: Eukaryota
- Kingdom: Animalia
- Phylum: Arthropoda
- Class: Insecta
- Order: Lepidoptera
- Family: Tortricidae
- Genus: Eudemis
- Species: E. profundana

Binomial name
- Eudemis profundana (Denis & Schiffermuller, 1775)

Synonyms
- Tortrix profundana [Denis & Schiffermuller], 1775; Tortrix aethiopiana Haworth, [1811]; Tortrix alphonsiana Duponchel, in Godart, 1834; Paedisca nebulana Donovan, [1806]; Eudemis profundana f. obscurata Gibeaux & Luquet, 1998; Eudemis profundana f. satans Gibeaux & Luquet, 1998; Phalaena (Tinea) triangulella Goeze, 1783; Tortrix wellensiana Hubner, [1811-1813]

= Eudemis profundana =

Species of moth

Eudemis profundana, common name diamond-back marble, is a moth of the family Tortricidae.

== Description ==
Eudemis profundana has a wingspan of 14–20 millimetres (0.55–0.79 in). Forewings are rather broad and rounded. The coloration is quite variable, ranging from dark brown to reddish, with greyish marbling and a large whitish dorsal patch. The upper edge of this patch is not deeply indented and the basal fasciae are developed also dorsally. These moths also show a raised reddish-brown mane and unusual starry eyes. They have one brood per year (univoltine). The larvae feed on Quercus and Malus species. They roll a leaf of their host and feed within. Adults are on wing from July to August.

== Distribution ==
This species can be found in most of Europe (except Iceland, Croatia and Greece). It is also found in the Near East.

== Habitat ==
Eudemis profundana lives in various habitats, mainly in the deciduous woodland, but also in gardens.
