= Samuel ben Nahman =

Jewish religious figure

Samuel ben Nahman (Hebrew: שמואל בן נחמן), or Samuel [bar] Nahmani (Hebrew: שמואל [בר] נחמני), was a rabbi and amora mentioned throughout the Talmud and Midrashic literature who lived in the Land of Israel from the beginning of the 3rd century CE until the start of the 4th century CE.

== Biography ==
He was a pupil of Jonathan ben Eleazar and one of the most famous aggadists of his time. He was a native of the Land of Israel and may have known Judah ha-Nasi.

It appears that he went to Lower Mesopotamia, called Babylonia by the Rabbinic Jews, in his youth, but soon returned to Israel. He seems to have gone to Babylon a second time in an official capacity to determine the intercalation of the year, which, for political reasons, could not be done in Israel. As an old man he went to the court of Zenobia (267-273), the powerful queen of Palmyra who invaded Roman Egypt, to petition her to pardon an orphaned youth who had committed a grave political crime. In the days of the patriarch Judah II, Samuel ben Nahman appears among the most intimate associates of the patriarch, with whom he went (286) to Tiberias at Diocletian's order; later he joined the emperor at Paneas.

Of Samuel's sons two are known by name—Nahman and Hillel; sayings of both have been preserved.

== Teachings ==
Samuel held a position of authority in the academy; to him is ascribed the rule that during the heat of the day instruction should be suspended. Due to his fame as an aggadist, questions were addressed to him by such authorities as the patriarch Judah II, Simeon ben Jehozadak, Rabbi Ammi, Hanina ben Pappa, and Helbo.

Among the transmitters of Samuel's sayings were Helbo, Levi II, Abbahu, and Eleazar ben Pedat.

Samuel ben Naḥman's decisions and sayings concern the study of dogma, prayer, and Shabbat regulations; the history of Israel and the nations and empires; the laws regarding converts; Scripture; halakic exegesis; and Biblical characters and narratives. One concept conceived by Samuel b. Naḥman recorded in Midrash Tanchuma is known as dirah betachtonim, which refers to the divine desire to manifest itself in the material world, later became a foundational concept in Chabad philosophy.

Other teachings of Samuel b. Naḥman refer to homiletics, to God and the world, and to eschatology.

=== Dirges ===
Especially noteworthy is Samuel b. Naḥman's description of the grief of the patriarchs Abraham, Isaac, Jacob, and of Rachel, over the destruction of the Temple. It is written in beautiful Hebrew prose, and is accompanied by dramatic dirges in Aramaic. Then follow the dirges of all the Patriarchs, which they intone when Moses for the second time has communicated to them the sad tidings. Finally, Moses himself chants a lament, addressed partly to the sun and partly to the enemy.
