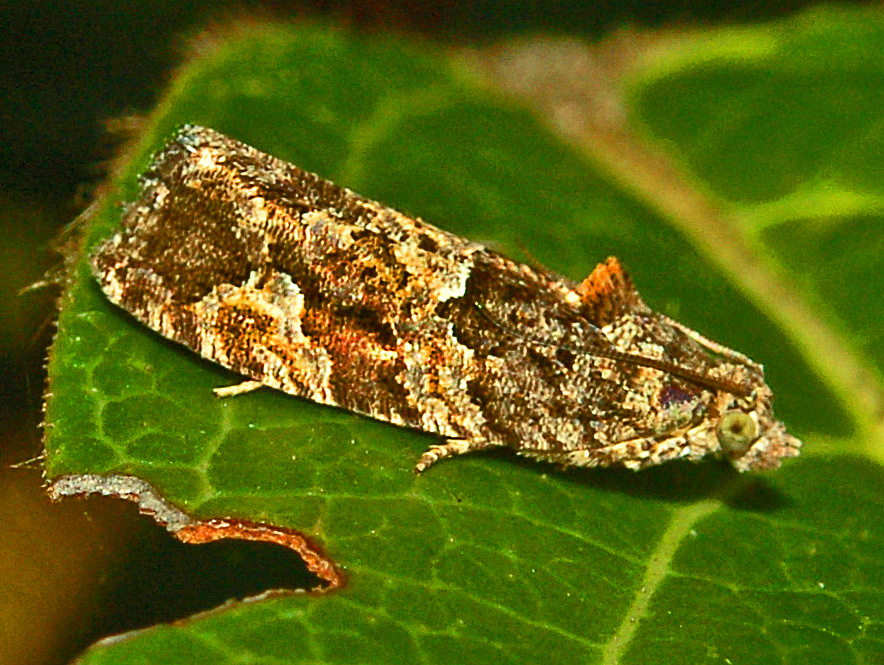
- Eudemis profundana

Scientific classification
- Domain: Eukaryota
- Kingdom: Animalia
- Phylum: Arthropoda
- Class: Insecta
- Order: Lepidoptera
- Family: Tortricidae
- Subfamily: Olethreutinae
- Tribe: Olethreutini
- Genus: Eudemis; Hübner, [1825]

= Eudemis =

Genus of tortrix moths

Eudemis is a genus of moths belonging to the subfamily Olethreutinae of the family Tortricidae.

== Species ==
- Eudemis brevisetosa Oku, 2005
- Eudemis centritis (Meyrick, 1912)
- Eudemis gyrotis (Meyrick, 1909)
- Eudemis lucina Liu & Bai, 1982
- Eudemis polychroma Diakonoff, 1981
- Eudemis porphyrana (Hubner, [1796-1799])
- Eudemis profundana (Denis & Schiffermuller, 1775)

== See also ==
- List of Tortricidae genera
