= Yom Chol =

In Judaism, Yom Chol (Hebrew: יוֹם חוֹל) is a day that is neither a Sabbath nor a Jewish holiday. The term "Chol" is derived from "Cholin" (חולין), indicating a day of lesser sacredness compared to the other significant days on the Jewish calendar.

The activities that are prohibited on the Sabbath are permitted on Yom Chol, thus these days are also known as the "six days of work" or "six days of action" (ששת ימי המעשה). During Yom Chol, there are three daily prayers: Maariv, Shacharit and Mincha. In Rosh Chodesh, an additional prayer, known as Mussaf, is included in the liturgy.

Another notable difference between Yom Chol and Sabbaths or holidays involves the recitation of Tachanun, a prayer said during Shacharit and Mincha.
