= Simeon ben Jehozadak =

Rabbi Simeon ben Jehozadak (רבי שמעון בן יהוצדק) was a rabbi who was one of the semi-tannaim on the border between the eras of tannaim and amoraim.

== Rabbi Shimon bar Yehotzadak (I) ==
He was a teacher of Rabbi Yochanan, who quotes many laws in his name.

He was a kohen; when he died in Lod, his brother Yochanan visited from the Galilee. R' Yochanan was present at Shimon's death.

== Rabbi Shimon bar Yehotzadak (II) ==
Once a Rabbi Shimon bar Yehotzadak and R' Hiyya bar Zarnuki went to declare a leap year in a place called Asya. This cannot be Shimon bar Yehotzadak (I), but must be a different individual.
