= Helbo =

Historical figure in Judaism

Rabbi Helbo (רבי חלבו) was an amora who flourished about the end of the 3rd century, and who is frequently mentioned in both Talmuds.

It seems that Helbo lived at first in Babylonia, where he studied under Rav Huna, the head of the Academy of Sura, and that, like the other Babylonian amoraim, he was called "Rav". Later he settled in the Land of Israel, where he was ordained rabbi.

== Teachings ==
He is mentioned as having spoken in the names of Avdimi of Haifa and Hama bar Ukva. In Palestine he consulted on halakhic matters R. Isaac Nappaha and R. Shmuel bar Nahmani.

Helbo handed down many aggadic sayings of Shmuel bar Nahmani. He is mentioned in the Talmud as a teacher of ethics, his sayings being delivered in the name of Rav Huna. Among them may be quoted:

- "He who goes out of the synagogue must not take long steps"
- "One should pay great attention to the Minhah prayer"
- "He who enjoys the banquet of a bridegroom without gladdening the latter commits a five-fold sin"
- "He who sees a torn scroll of the Pentateuch must rend his garment in two places"

Helbo also said, in the name of Ulla, that one who sees the ruined cities of Judah must recite Isaiah 64:9–10 In Genesis Rabbah, in the name of R. Eleazar, Helbo is mentioned as a traditionist with R. Berechiah and R. Ammi.

Rabbi Helbo held a discouraging view of converts to Judaism: "Converts are more difficult for Israel than a sore."

== Other rabbis named Helbo ==
A Helbo b. Hilfa b. Samkai is also mentioned, who may be identical with the Helbo in this article. There is also reference to a R. Helbo b. Hanan.
