= Ma Nishtana =

First words of each of Four Questions in the Seder observance

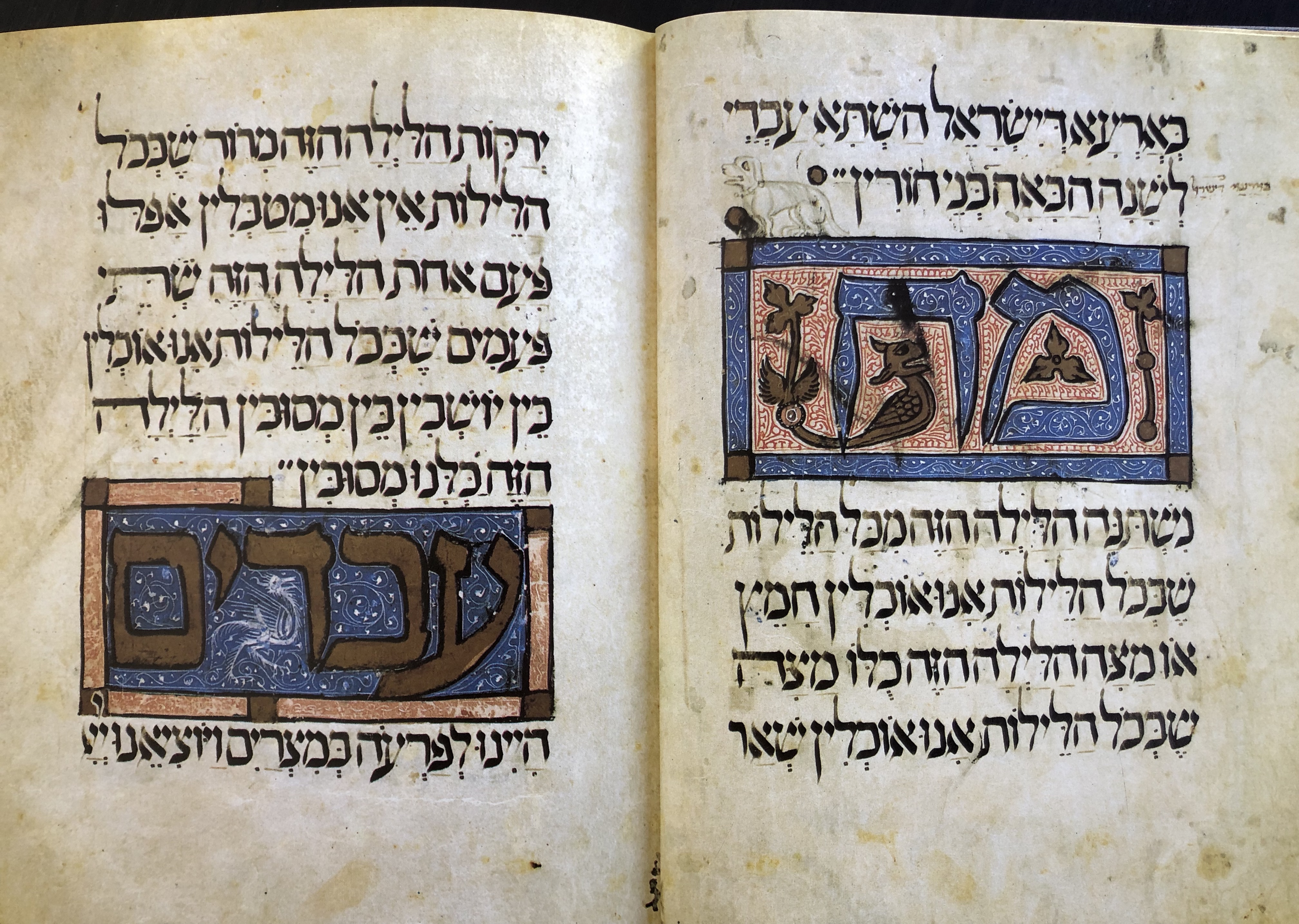
The Four Questions (Ma Nishtana) from the 14th century Sarajevo Haggadah

Ma Nishtana (Hebrew: מה נשתנה) is a section at the beginning of the Passover Haggadah known as The Four Kushiyot, The Four Questions or "Why is this night different from all other nights?", traditionally asked via song by the youngest capable child attending Passover Seder.

The questions are included in the haggadah as part of the Maggid (מגיד) section.

== Origins ==
The questions originate in the Mishna, Pesachim 10:4, but are quoted differently in the Jerusalem and Babylonian Talmuds. The Jerusalem Talmud only records three questions; why foods are dipped twice as opposed to once, why matzah is eaten, and why the meat sacrifice eaten is exclusively roasted. (The last question is a reference to the paschal sacrifice which was fire-roasted). The Babylonian Talmud quotes four questions; why matzah is eaten, why maror is eaten, why meat that is eaten is exclusively roasted, and why food is dipped twice. The version in the Jerusalem Talmud is also the one most commonly found in manuscripts. As the paschal sacrifice was not eaten after the destruction of the temple, the question about the meat was dropped. The Rambam and Saadia Gaon both add a new question to the liturgy to replace it: "why do we recline on this night?" Ultimately, the question of reclining was maintained, in part to create a parallelism between the number of questions and the other occurrences of the number four in the hagaddah.

Shmuel and Ze'ev Safrai point out that many early versions of the Haggadah from Genizah manuscripts reflect the versions of the Jerusalem Talmud and other sources from the Land of Israel, including Ma Nishtana.

== Contemporary tunes ==
Ma Nishtana in Yiddish

Traditionally, Ma Nishtana is recited in the chant form called the major lern-steiger ("study mode" – a chant used for reciting lessons from the Talmud or Mishnah). One of the current tunes widely used for the Ma Nishtana was written by Ephraim Abileah in 1936 as part of his oratorio "Chag Ha-Cherut".

== Text ==
The following text is that which is recorded in the original printed Haggadah.

| English | Transliteration | Hebrew |
|---|---|---|
| Why is this night different from all the other nights?; | Mah nishtanah, ha-laylah ha-zeh, mi-kol ha-leylot | מַה נִּשְׁתַּנָּה, הַלַּיְלָה הַזֶּה מִכָּל הַלֵּילוֹת |
| That on all other nights we eat both chametz and matzah, on this night, we eat only matzah. | She-b'khol ha-leylot 'anu 'okhlin chameytz u-matzah, ha-laylah ha-zeh, kulo matzah | שֶׁבְּכָל הַלֵּילוֹת אָנוּ אוֹכְלִין חָמֵץ וּמַצָּה הַלַּיְלָה הַזֶּה, כֻּלּוֹ מַצָּה |
| That on all other nights we eat many vegetables, on this night, maror. | She-b'khol ha-leylot 'anu 'okhlin sh'ar y'rakot, ha-laylah ha-zeh, maror | שֶׁבְּכָל הַלֵּילוֹת אָנוּ אוֹכְלִין שְׁאָר יְרָקוֹת הַלַּיְלָה הַזֶּה, מָרוֹר |
| That on all other nights we do not dip vegetables even once, on this night, we dip twice. | She-b'khol ha-leylot 'eyn 'anu matbilin 'afilu pa`am 'achat, ha-laylah ha-zeh, shtey p`amim | שֶׁבְּכָל הַלֵּילוֹת אֵין אָנוּ מַטְבִּילִין אֲפִילוּ פַּעַם אֶחָת הַלַּיְלָה הַזֶּה, שְׁתֵּי פְעָמִים |
| That on all other nights some eat and drink sitting with others reclining, but on this night, we are all reclining. | She-b'khol ha-leylot 'anu 'okhlin ushotin beyn yoshvin u-veyn m'subin, ha-laylah ha-zeh, kulanu m'subin | שֶׁבְּכָל הַלֵּילוֹת אָנוּ אוֹכְלִין ושותין בֵּין יוֹשְׁבִין וּבֵין מְסֻבִּין הַלַּיְלָה הַזֶּה, כֻּלָּנוּ מְסֻבִּין |

=== Alternate order ===
In the Ashkenazi tradition, the order is as follows: 1. Eating matzah 2. Eating bitter herbs 3. Dipping the food 4. Reclining. The Ashkenazi communities also omit the use of the word "ushotin", which means "to drink".

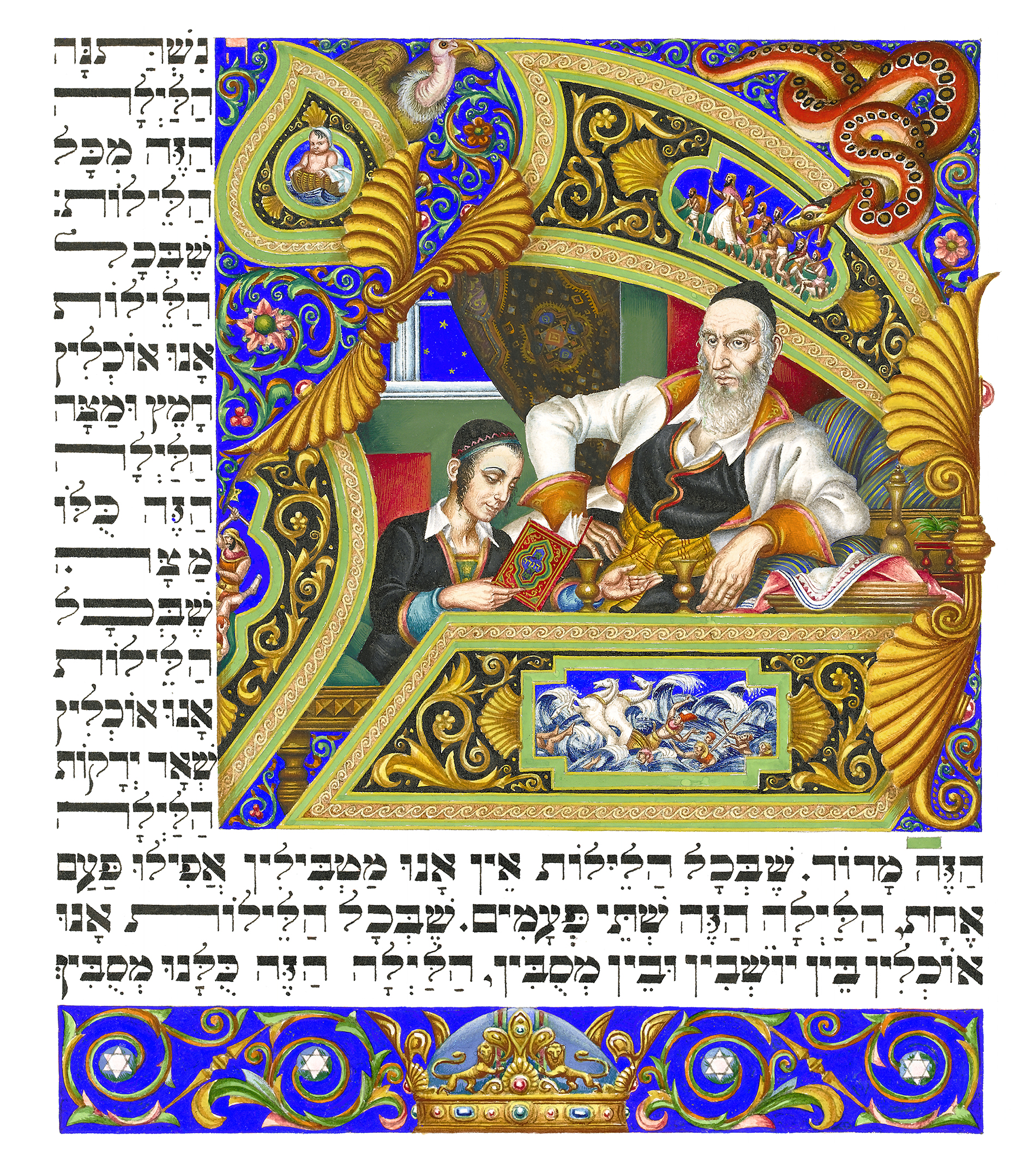
The Four Questions (1935), Łódź, Poland

=== History ===
A fifth question which is present in the mishnah has been removed by later authorities due to its inapplicability after the destruction of the Second Temple:

5. Why is it that on all other nights we eat meat either roasted, marinated, or cooked, but on this night it is entirely roasted?

=== Answers ===
The answers to the four questions (and the historic fifth question) are:

1. We eat only matzah because our ancestors could not wait for their breads to rise when they were fleeing slavery in Egypt, and so they were flat when they came out of the oven.
2. We eat only Maror, a bitter herb, to remind us of the bitterness of slavery that our ancestors endured while in Egypt.
3. The first dip, green vegetables in salt water, symbolizes the replacing of our tears with gratitude; the second dip, Maror in Charoset, symbolizes the sweetening of our burden of bitterness and suffering.
4. We recline at the Seder table because in ancient times, a person who reclined at a meal was a free person, while slaves and servants stood.
5. We eat only roasted meat because that is how the Pesach/Passover lamb is prepared during sacrifice in the Temple at Jerusalem.

Some of these answers are stated over the course of the Seder.

== Contemporary use ==
The four questions are traditionally asked by the youngest person at the table that is able to do so. Much of the seder is designed to fulfill the biblical obligation to tell the story to one's children, and many of the customs that have developed around the Four Questions are designed to pique a child's curiosity about what is happening in order to hold their attention.

== See also ==
- Passover Seder
- Passover
