= Pesach Sheni =

Jewish holiday of Second Passover

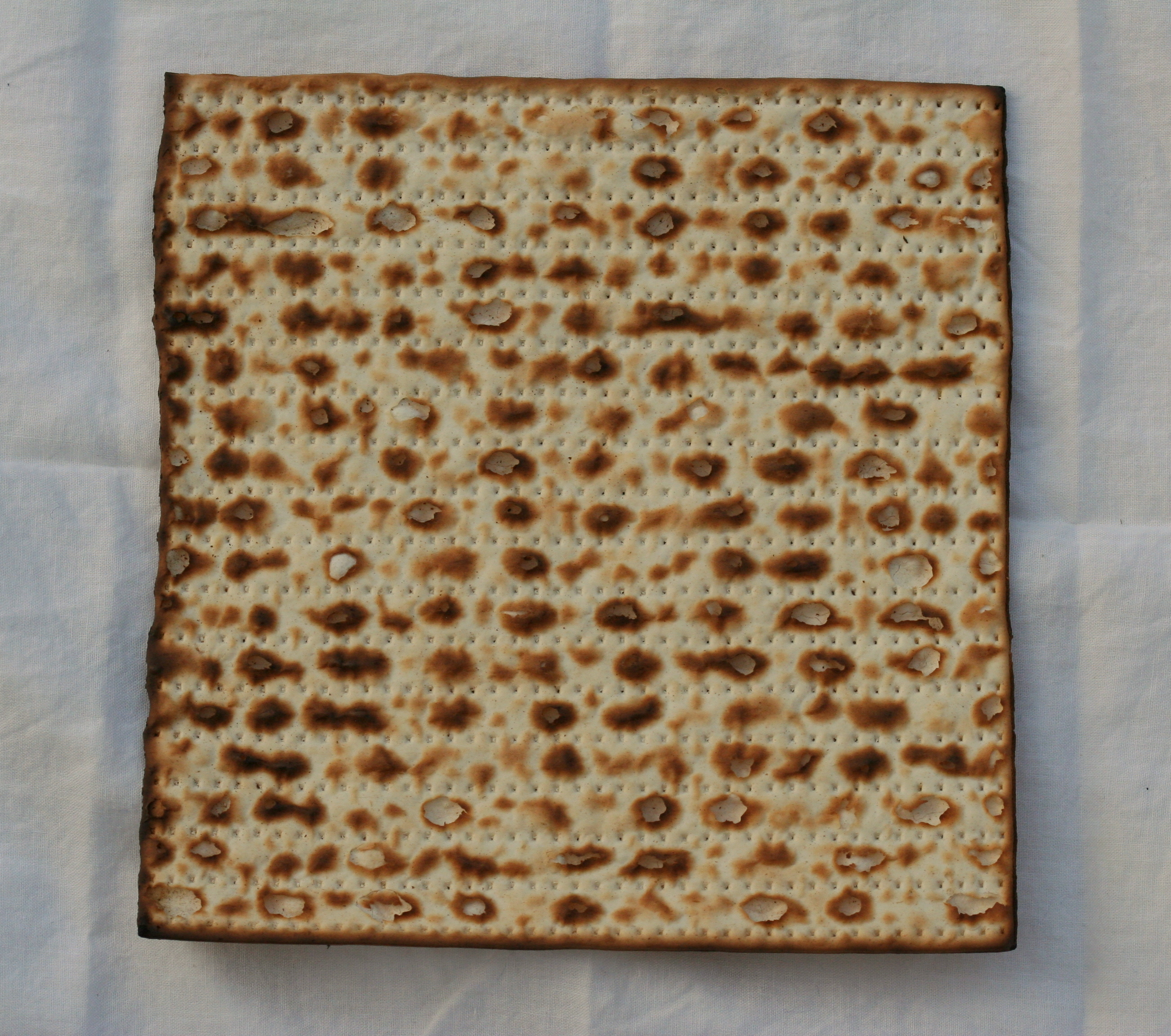
- Many eat matzo on Pesach Sheni in remembrance of the Korban Pesach
- Official name: Hebrew: פסח שני
- Also called: Translation: "Second Passover"
- Observed by: Jews
- Type: Jewish
- Significance: Day to make up the Korban Pesach (Pascal lamb sacrifice) if missed on Passover
- Celebrations: Some Chasidic Jews conduct a seder resembling a Passover seder
- Date: 14th day of Iyar
- 2024 date: Sunset, 21 May – nightfall, 22 May
- 2025 date: Sunset, 11 May – nightfall, 12 May
- 2026 date: Sunset, 30 April – nightfall, 1 May
- 2027 date: Sunset, 20 May – nightfall, 21 May
- Related to: Passover

Pesach Sheni
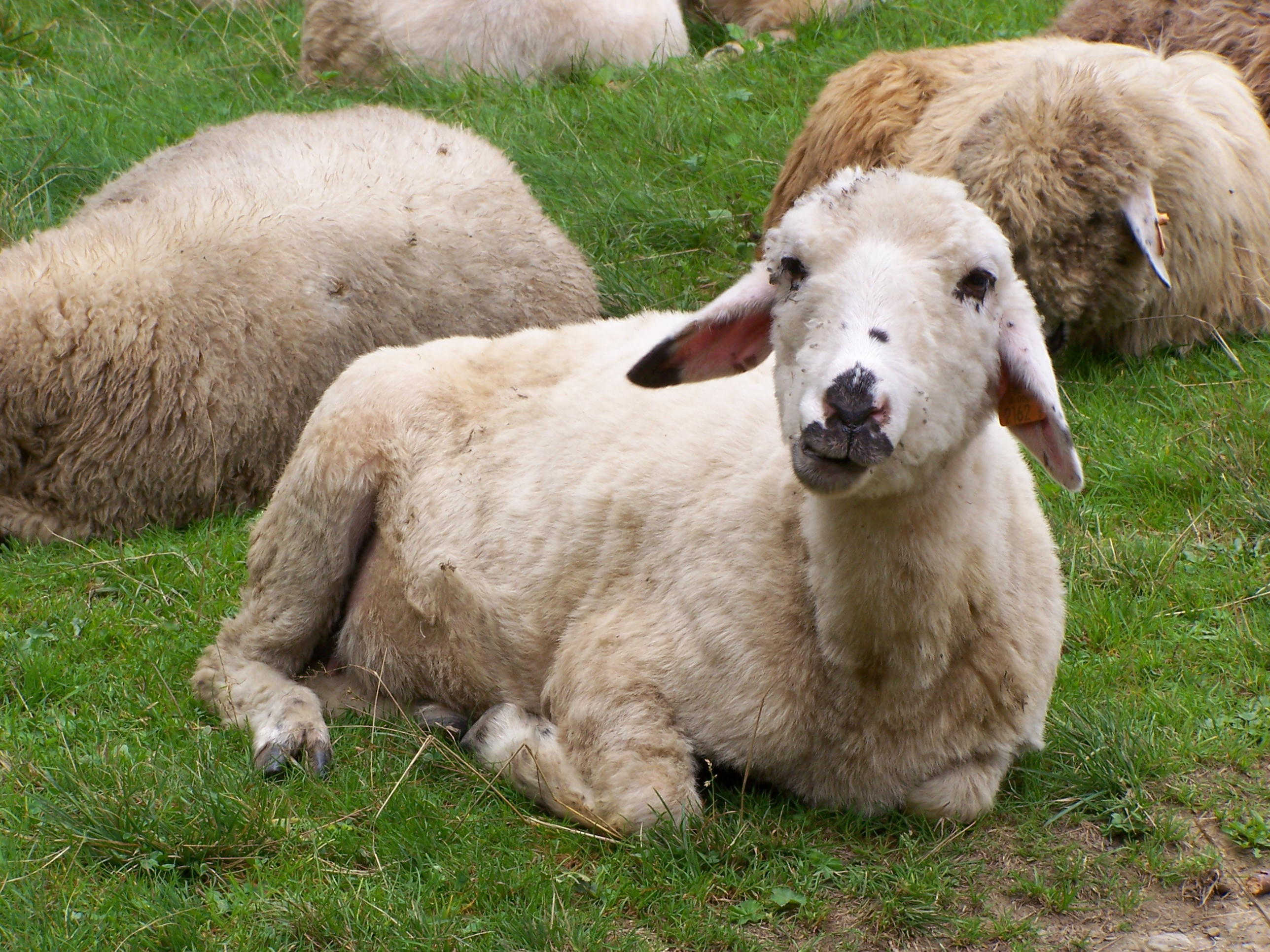
- Lambs were used for the Passover sacrifice.

Halakhic texts relating to this article
- Torah: Numbers 9:1–14
- Mishnah: Pesahim 9:1–4
- Babylonian Talmud: Pesahim 92b-96a

Pesach Sheni (Hebrew: פסח שני, trans. Second Passover) occurs every year on 14 Iyar. This is exactly one month after 14 Nisan, the day before Passover, which was the day prescribed for bringing the Korban Pesach ("Paschal offering", i.e. Passover lamb) in anticipation of that holiday. As described in the source text for this mitzvah (Numbers 9:1–14), the Israelites were about to celebrate Passover one year after leaving Egypt.

The offering of the Korban Pesach was at the core of that celebration. However "certain men" were ritually impure from contact with human corpses, and were therefore ineligible to participate in the Korban Pesach. Faced with the conflict of the requirement to participate in the Korban Pesach and their ineligibility due to impurity, they approached Moses and Aaron for instructions, which resulted in the communication of the law of Pesach Sheni.

== Observance during the Temple period ==
=== Eligibility ===
As described in Numbers 9:9–13, a Jew may bring the Korban Pesach on Pesach Sheni if s/he was ritually impure due to contact with a dead body or was on a "distant journey". As elucidated in Mishnah Pesahim (9:1–4) and its Gemara:

- The definition of "distant journey" for this purpose is generally construed liberally.
- All types of ritual impurity are generally included, not only those due to contact with a human body.

In net effect, anyone unavoidably prevented from offering the Korban Pesach on Passover may do so on Pesach Sheni provided that most of the nation were pure and brought on the first Passover. However one may not intentionally defer the Korban Pesach if it is in his/her power to offer it on Passover.

=== Similarities and differences compared to Passover ===
The Mishnah (9:3) and Gemara outline the following similarities and differences in the laws of the Korban Pesach when it is offered on Pesach Sheni, compared to when it is offered on Passover:

Same:

- The particulars of the sacrifice itself—what animals can be used, that it must be roasted, that it must be eaten together with matzo and bitter herbs, that its bones cannot be broken, that it is eaten until midnight, that any leftovers must be burned.
- Hallel is recited during its offering, offering overrides Shabbat prohibitions, only those previously "registered" prior to slaughter may partake.

Different:

- The only restriction concerning chametz (leavened food) is that it cannot be eaten with the Korban Pesach. It is otherwise permissible to own it, and to see it in plain sunlight, unlike on Passover.
- More generally, the full seven-day Ḥag haMatzot (Festival of Unleavened Bread)—the holiday now commonly referred to as Passover—is not observed in conjunction with Pesach Sheni.
- Hallel is not recited at the meal when the Korban Pesach is consumed, unlike on Passover.
- Rabbi Moses Sofer was of the opinion that unlike Korban Pesach proper, which was slaughtered after the Korban Tamid (the bidaily diurnal offering), Korban Pesach Sheni was slaughtered before the Tamid. His opinion is in contrast with what is written in the Tosafot, which asserts that Pesach Sheni is likewise slaughtered after the Tamid.

== Observance in modern times ==
Due to the destruction of the Temple in Jerusalem, Jews are unable to perform the Passover sacrifice, neither on Passover nor on Pesach Sheni. Some have the custom to eat matzo during Pesach Sheni in memory of the sacrifice. Others say that the reason for eating Matzo is because the 14th of Iyar was the day that the Matzo that was taken out of Egypt was finished. Some have the custom to omit Tahanun from the daily prayer service, though this custom is not observed universally.

=== In Hasidism ===
Pesach Sheni is relatively prominent in Chabad as well as in Hasidic thought. One theme commonly expressed for this holiday is second chances. In several Hasidic groups, the rebbe conducts a tish on Pesach Sheni.

The Rebbes of Nadvorna and related groups conduct a tish with four cups of wine, matza and maror, in the manner of a seder.

=== LGBTQIA communities ===
In 2009, organizations in Israel promoting acceptance of LGBTQ people and others within Jewish faith communities began using Pesach Sheni as an opportunity to educate. Organizations organize events in schools, homes, and religious seminaries where a member of the community speaks and share their experiences. This practice has subsequently spread to communities outside Israel, particularly among Orthodox Jews.

== See also ==
- Chol HaMoed, the intermediate days of Passover and Sukkot.
- Isru chag refers to the day after each of the Three Pilgrimage Festivals.
- Mimouna, a traditional North African Jewish celebration held the day after Passover.
- Purim Katan is when during a Jewish leap year Purim is celebrated during Adar II so that the 14th of Adar I is then called Purim Katan.
- Shushan Purim falls on Adar 15 and is the day on which Jews in Jerusalem celebrate Purim.
- Yom Kippur Katan is a practice observed by some Jews on the day preceding each Rosh Chodesh or New-Moon Day.
- Yom tov sheni shel galuyot refers to the observance of an extra day of Jewish holidays outside of the land of Israel.
