= Pesachim =

Tractate of the Talmud

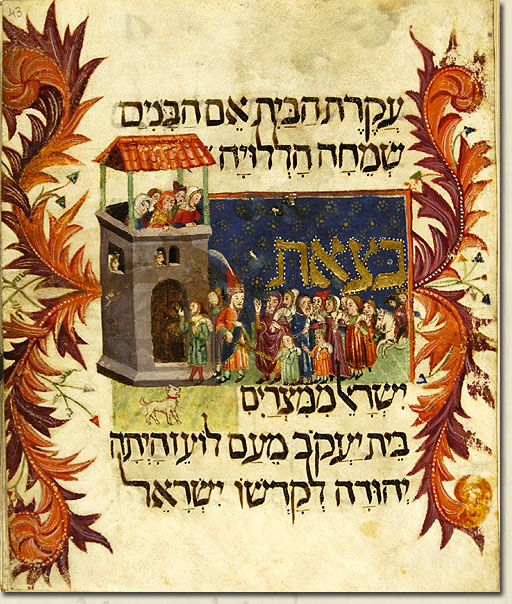
- Illustration in the Kaufmann Haggadah.

Tractate of the Talmud
- Seder: Moed
- Number of mishnahs: 89
- Chapters: 10
- Babylonian Talmud pages: 121
- Jerusalem Talmud pages: 71

Pesachim (Hebrew: פְּסָחִים, lit. "Paschal lambs" or "Passovers"), also spelled Pesahim, is the third tractate of Seder Moed ("Order of Festivals") of the Mishnah and of the Talmud. The tractate discusses the topics related to the Jewish holiday of Passover, and the Passover sacrifice, both called "Pesach" in Hebrew. The tractate deals with the laws of matza (unleavened bread) and maror (bitter herbs), the prohibitions against owning or consuming chametz (leaven) on the festival, the details of the Paschal lamb that used to be offered at the Temple in Jerusalem, the order of the feast on the first evening of the holiday known as the Passover seder, and the laws of the supplemental "Second Pesach".

Two reasons are given for the name of the tractate Pesachim being in the plural: either because the tractate originally comprised two parts, one dealing with the Passover sacrifice, and the second with the other aspects of the holiday, before they were combined into a single tractate named Pesachim during the Geonic period (by 1040 CE), or, because the tractate deals with the two occasions for offering the Passover sacrifice, namely, the 14th of the month of Nisan on the eve of the holiday, and one month later, the "second Pesach" on the 14th of Iyar for those who were unable to offer the sacrifice on the original date.

The basis for the laws included in this tractate are derived from the Torah, largely from the Book of Exodus, in Exodus 12:1-29, Leviticus 23:5-8, Exodus 13:3-10 and Exodus 23:15-18, as well as Leviticus 23:5-8, Numbers 9:2-14 and Numbers 28:16-25, and Deuteronomy 16:1-8.

The tractate consists of ten chapters and has a Gemara – rabbinical analysis of and commentary on the Mishnah – in both the Babylonian and Jerusalem Talmud. There is also a Tosefta for this tractate.

Apart from the Passover sacrifice, the Jewish religious laws derived from this tractate regarding Passover have continued to be observed, with minor variations according the interpretations of later halakhic authorities, by traditional Jewish communities since ancient times until the present. The observances include the prohibitions on eating, benefiting from or possessing any leaven, and the sale or search for and removal of leaven from the house before Passover; the practices of the Seder night, including eating matza and bitter herbs, drinking four cups of wine, and reciting the Haggadah recalling the Exodus from Egypt; as well as the observances of the entire holiday, including the eating of matza and the recitation of the Hallel prayer.

== Etymology ==
The name of the tractate Pesachim is the Hebrew plural of the name of the Passover festival Pesach, and there are two explanations given for this:

Firstly, the tractate contains two distinct parts, which were originally separate, until combined into a single tractate during the Geonic period (by 1040 CE). Until then, the tractate was divided into two parts called Pesaḥ Rishon ("First Passover" or "Passover I") and Pesaḥ Sheni ("Second Passover" or "Passover II"). After the two parts were combined, the tractate was called Pesachim, in the plural.

One part, now comprising chapters one to four and chapter ten, addresses the laws of Passover that apply always and everywhere, such as the removal of chametz from the home, the eating of matzah, and the Seder on Passover night. The second part, now chapters five to nine, concern the laws of how the Passover sacrifice was offered and eaten at the Temple in Jerusalem while it existed. This part is more relevant thematically to Seder Kodashim, the order of the Mishna concerned mainly with the sacrificial offerings in the Temple.

In the only surviving manuscript that contains the complete text of the Babylonian Talmud, known as the Munich Codex, the current tenth chapter appears as the fourth, so that the chapters concerning the practical observances of the festival follow one another consecutively.

The early medieval Jewish commentators, known as the Rishonim, also refer to the first part of the tractate as "Pesach Rishon", and the second part about the sacrifices as "Pesach Sheni". The Meiri (1249–1315) states clearly in his introduction to the tractate that during the immediately preceding Geonic period, Pesachim was divided into two tractates. This distinction is also marked explicitly in the Vilna edition in the Hadran at the end of the fourth chapter (Talmud, b. Pesachim 57b) and ninth chapter (Talmud, b. Pesachim 99a) of the tractate.

A second reason given for the plural name of the tractate is that there are, in fact, two Passovers: the "second Pesach" on the 14th of Iyar was instituted a month after Passover for those who were unable to offer the Passover sacrifice on the eve of the holiday on 14th of the month of Nisan, in accordance with Leviticus 9:6-12. Accordingly, the title of the tractate in the plural recognizes this, although the Mishnah almost entirely concerns the first or "Great" Passover.

== Subject matter ==
The subject matter of this tractate covers the various laws of all the aspects of the Passover holiday. The Mishna follows a mostly sequential order, beginning with the search for chametz (leaven) on the evening of the thirteenth of Nisan, the day before Passover, and the prohibition of leaven in all its aspects; the details of the Passover sacrifice on the eve of the holiday; and the laws of matzah and bitter herbs with which the sacrifice was to be eaten, during the ritual meal on Passover night, known as the Seder, with which the tractate concludes.

The topics discussed in this tractate are derived from the Torah in the Book of Exodus, Exodus 12:1-29, Exodus 12:43-49, Exodus 13:3-10 and Exodus 23:15-18, as well as Leviticus 23:5-8, Numbers 9:2-14 and Numbers 28:16-25, and Deuteronomy 16:1-8.

Other Biblical references to the subject matter are found in Joshua 5:10-11, 2 Kings 23:21-23, Ezekiel 45:21-24, Ezra 6:19-22, 2 Chronicles 30:1-5, and 2 Chronicles 35:1-19.

== Structure and content ==
In all the editions of the Mishnah, Pesachim is the third tractate of the order Mo'ed. The tractate comprises ten chapters and 89 paragraphs (mishnayot). It has a Gemara – rabbinical analysis of and commentary on the Mishnah, of 121 folio (double-sided) pages in the Babylonian Talmud and 71 folio pages in the Jerusalem Talmud. There is a Tosefta of ten chapters on this tractate.

Tractate Pesahim can be divided into three sections: The first four chapters dealing primarily with laws concerning the removal of leaven (chametz); the next five chapters dealing with the Passover sacrifice and the tenth and final chapter describing the procedure for the Seder, the meal on the first night of the Passover festival.

An overview of the topics of the chapters is as follows:

- Chapter 1 deals with the search for leaven (bedikat chametz) and its removal, when and where it is necessary, and how and when chametz is to be destroyed, and the time limit for eating leavened food on the day before Passover; it describes the signal on the Temple Mount in Jerusalem to notify the people when they were required to destroy their chametz; and concludes with regulations about burning unclean sacred food.
- Chapter 2 continues the subject of chametz, such as the time from which any benefit from leavened food other than eating it is forbidden, the status of leaven which was kept until after Passover, including the status of leaven pawned or as pledges for monetary loans to non-Jews; it then discusses the making of the matzah, plants that can be used as maror and the circumstances under which they may be eaten, and means to prevent substances becoming leaven during the festival.
- Chapter 3 lists various foods regarded as cḥametẓ, and which are not chametz themselves but contain leaven and for which a person failing to destroy them is guilty of transgressing the Biblical prohibitions, the search for leaven and its removal when the eve of Passover occurs on a Sabbath, cases in which travelers, who have set out on a journey and remember that they had not destroyed leavened food at home must return to do so; and by association, cases in which a pilgrim, returning home from Jerusalem, discovers that they are carrying sacrificial meat, must go back to burn it at the Temple in Jerusalem.
- Chapter 4 begins with the statement that refraining from work on the eve of Passover depends on local custom (minhag) and discusses the strength of local customs in making and determining law; it then digresses to discuss various laws which depend on local customs and the binding force of customs in several different matters, and references practices of which the Rabbis did not approve and the extent to which they were able to stop them.
- Chapter 5 begins the discussion of the Passover sacrifice and other aspects of the sacrificial service at the Temple in Jerusalem, including the timing of the daily sacrifice (tamid) on the eve of Passover, and time for the sacrifice of the Passover sacrifice and circumstances which disqualify a lamb for use as the Passover sacrifice; it continues to describe the ceremonies in the Temple accompanying the slaughtering of the Passover sacrifice, the rows of priests, the accompanying music, and the three groups of the people who are required to recite the "Hallel" and finally, the manner of slaughtering the sacrifice when the eve o Passover falls on a Sabbath, and further preparation of the paschal lamb.
- Chapter 6 continues to discuss the sacrificial arrangement when Passover falls on a Sabbath, and with related issues such as when another animal must be sacrificed together with the paschal lamb, animals used for this sacrifice, and cases in which slaughtering the Passover sacrifice on the Sabbath is forbidden.
- Chapter 7 begins with the methods for roasting the Passover sacrifice, and examines problems regarding ritual impurity (tumah) affecting a person participating in the sacrifices, including those sacrifices which a person who is in a state of tumah may offer but not eat; the position when either the community or the sacrifice or parts of it become ritually impure; the time when the inedible parts of the offering such as the bones, and other remnants of the sacrifice must be burned, what part of the animal can be eaten, and the regulations about separate groups eating their sacrificial meat together in the same location.
- Chapter 8 considers the questions of who may offer the Passover sacrifice on behalf of another, the position of women, slaves, mourners, and the ritually impure in respect of the Passover offering, and the requirement of registering for a particular sacrifice and being permitted to eat only of that sacrificial animal’s meat, and by association with this, other laws of registration are also discussed.
- Chapter 9 begins with the regulations for those who are ritually impure or on a distant journey and unable to observe the Passover sacrifice at the proper time and are required to observe the Second Passover a month later, the difference between the first and the second Passover and the difference between the Passover which was celebrated in Egypt during the Exodus and all subsequent Passovers; the chapter transitions to discuss a variety of other problems, such as the exchange ("temurah") of a Passover sacrifice, offering of a female animal, mixing of the Passover sacrifice with other sacrifices, and cases in which the animal designated as a Passover sacrifice has been lost or exchanged.
- Chapter 10 reviews the arrangements and regulations for the Passover night meal, the Seder, in detail, including the four cups of wine, and the blessings recited over them, the questions asked and the narrative response to them (from which the Haggadah is compiled), as well as additional blessings and the recitation of the "Hallel" thanksgiving praise.

== Historical context and significance ==
And thou shalt tell your child in that day, saying: It is because of that which the Lord did for me when I came forth out of Egypt.

— Exodus 13:8,

The Mishna was composed towards the end of the Mishnaic period (c. 30 BCE - 200 CE) in the Roman province of Judea and forms an early part in the lengthy development of Jewish law regarding the observance of the Passover holiday.

The Passover holiday was a central pilgrimage festival of the Jews when the Temple in Jerusalem still stood. Passover was a unique combination of a home and Temple holiday — although the paschal lamb was slaughtered in the Temple, it was not consumed by the priests but rather by groups of Jews called havurot — fellowship groups, and the rules of composition for these groups are detailed in the tractate. The tenth chapter of the tractate, containing the descriptions and instructions for the Seder, as it became known in the post-Talmudic period, has been of continued importance from the time of its composition in antiquity, describing as it does one of the most carefully observed rituals of all Jewish communities until modern times.

By the time the Mishnah was compiled in the second century C.E., significant parts of the Haggadah, the traditional Passover narrative, were already formulated and in use as they are today. What are now the "Four Questions" originate in the Mishnah (Pesahim 10:4), and includes the question "On all other nights we eat meat roasted, stewed, or cooked; why on this night only roast meat?" The "Questions" were thus already part of the Seder during the period of the Second Temple when the Passover lamb was sacrificed as an offering and roasted and eaten at the home celebrations. After the destruction of the Temple, the question concerning leaning was substituted for the one about the roast offering, which had by then lost its immediate relevance to the evening’s ceremonial meal. The question about bitter herbs was also a later addition.

The annual retelling of the story of the redemption from Egypt, as prescribed by the Mishnah, formed an ongoing reiteration of the Jewish belief in God’s past and ongoing protection. Throughout history, the story of the Exodus continued to capture the imagination of Jews, and non-Jews, who drew inspiration from it to strive for their freedom and the connection of their history to the future.

== Liturgical uses ==
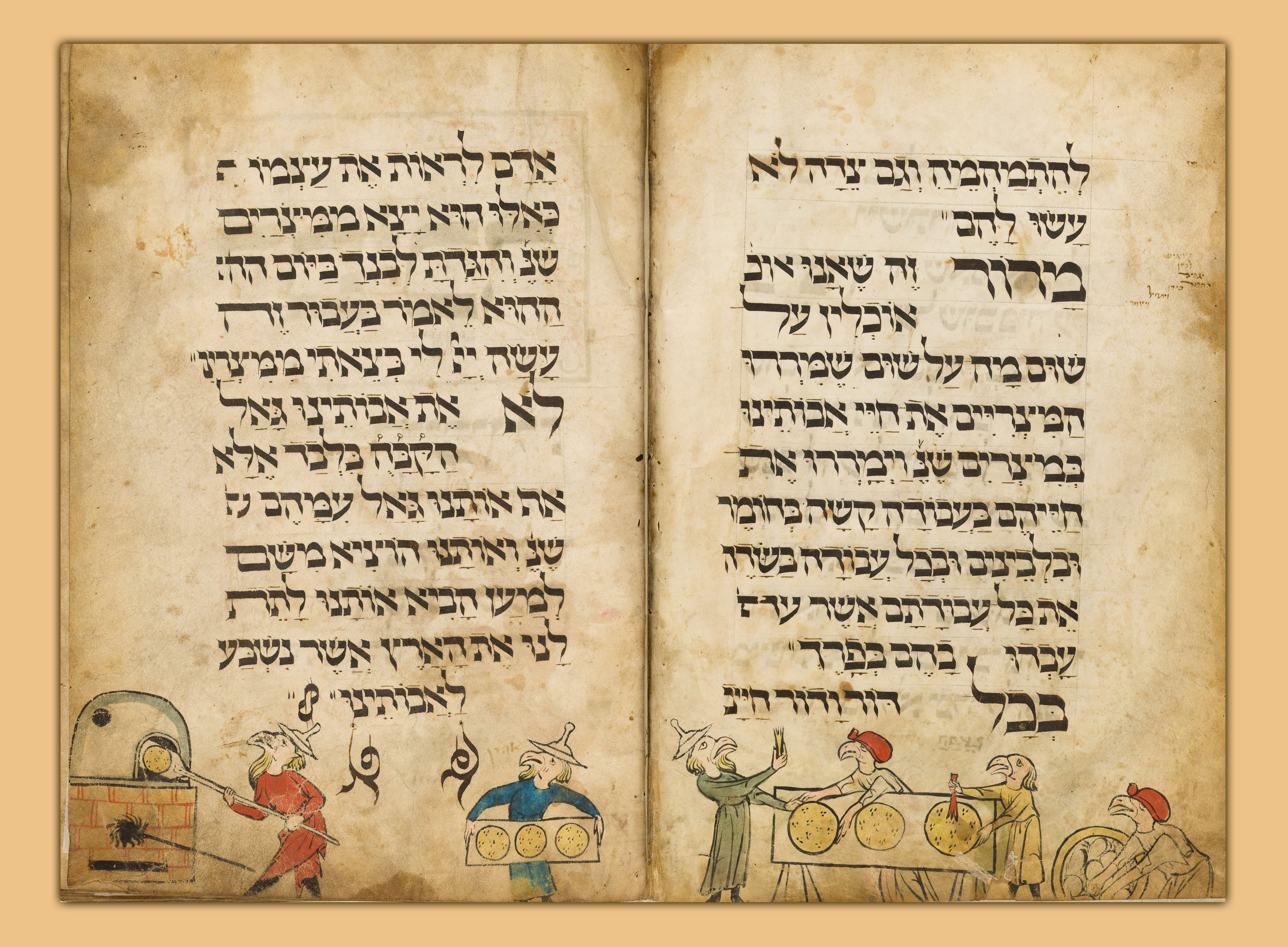
14th century illuminated Haggadah manuscript showing text quoted from the Mishnah (Pesachim 10:5)

The structure and content of most of the liturgical selections used at the Seder were defined during the period of the Mishnah, and with some minor variations, came to comprise the traditional Haggadah that is used by Jewish communities to this day. The Talmudic passages of this tractate formed the basis for one of the earliest known partial texts of the Haggadah, included by Amram Gaon (c. 850 C.E.) in his daily prayer book, and the prayer book of Saadia Gaon (10th century) presents the earliest complete text of the Haggadah, although it begins differently from today's version. By the 11th century, the version in Mahzor Vitry is almost the same as that in use today. By the time Maimonides (1135-1204) published it in his Mishneh Torah, the text of the Haggadah was essentially the same as the one in present use.

The opening words of the Haggadah, after the Kiddush that is recited at all holiday meals, is a declaration in Aramaic that appears to have been added to the Seder liturgy after the destruction of the Temple, commencing with the words ha lahma anya ("this is the bread of affliction") describing the matzo, and inviting the poor to join the meal. It ends with the declaration "This year we are here; next year may we be in the Land of Israel; this year we are slaves, next year may we be free people", encapsulating an essential theme of the Seder’s message.

The text of Ma Nishtana ("How is this night different") and now known as "The Four Questions" originates in the Mishnah (Pesachim 10:4) as a set of statements said after the meal and not before it, by the father rather than the child (Talmud, b. Pesachim 116a). It passed through several stages, notably after the destruction of the Temple, when the statements were posed as questions designed to maintain the attention of the children during the telling of the Passover story which now took place before the meal; the statement about the roast offering was replaced by the one concerning reclining, and the question about bitter herbs was added.

The passage Avadim Hayinu ("We were slaves of Pharaoh in Egypt") begins the formal telling of the story of the exodus from Egypt, following the Mishnah’s directive to "begin with the shame and end with the praise" (Pesachim 10:4). The Talmud records the views of two third-century Talmudic sages, Rav and Shmuel, regarding the starting point and content of the narrative (Talmud, b. Pesachim 116a), either "We were slaves..." or "In the beginning our ancestors were idol worshippers..." At different times one or the other introduction was used, but both views were finally accommodated in the Haggadah, beginning with the answer according to Shmuel.

The account in the Haggadah of five leading sages of the Mishnah the second century C.E., Rabbis Eliezer, Joshua, Eleazar ben Azariah, Akiba and Tarfon, who spent the entire night in Bnei Brak talking about the Exodus from Egypt, is found only in the Haggadah, but the debate is cited in the Mishnah (Berachot 1: 5) and in the Midrash, and a similar story is found in Tosefta of this tractate (Pesachim 10:12).

Following the ruling prescribed in the Mishnah "that according to the understanding of the child, the father instructs him" (Pesachim 10:4), the Haggadah liturgy includes the section of The Four Sons from the Jerusalem Talmud and the midrashic Mekhilta de-Rabbi Ishmael. Although there are differences between the versions in the Talmud and the Haggadah, the text incorporates the four biblical verses describing the Exodus (Ex. 12:26, 13:8, 13:14, and Deut. 6:20) and associates them with four archetypical children who are to be instructed according to their temperaments.

The statements of Rabban Gamaliel explaining the significance of the Passover sacrifice, the matzah, and the bitter herbs (Pesachim 10:5), are included in the Haggadah. These were formulated into a question and answer arrangement in the text of the Haggadah after the Talmudic period. From the same Mishnah, a fundamental passage of the Haggadah, "Every person in every generation must regard themselves as having been personally freed from Egypt…" is also quoted directly. The text concluding the narration of the story and introducing the first part of the Hallel thanksgiving prayer, beginning "Therefore it is our duty to thank…" is also directly quoted from this Mishnah.
