= Five species of grain =

Category of plants in Jewish law

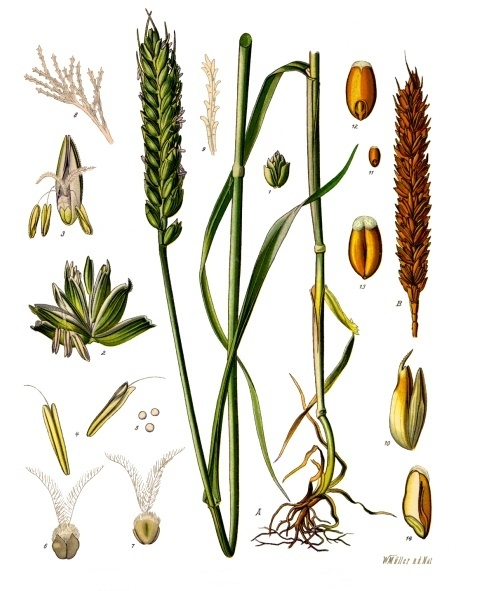

In Judaism, the five species of grain (Hebrew: חמשת מיני דגן, romanized: hameshet minei dagan) refer to five varieties of grain which have special status for a number of rituals. These species are commonly considered to be wheat, barley, oats, rye and spelt. However, some of these identifications are disputed.

== Identity ==
The five species, with their Mishnaic Hebrew names, are as follows:

- Hitah (חִיטָּה ḥīṭṭā) – wheat
- Kusmin (כּוּסְמִין kūsmīn) – emmer wheat, but historically taken to refer to spelt
- Seorah (שְׂעוֹרָה śəʿōrā) – barley
- Shibolet shual (שִׁיבּוֹלֶת שׁוּעָל šībōleṯ šūʿāl) – oats or two-rowed barley. The name literally means "fox ear". Rashi holds this to be oats, and Maimonides holds it to be a type of "wild barley," while Rabbi Nathan ben Abraham called it by its Arabic name sunbulat al-tha'alib (Fox's spike).
- Shifon (שִׁיפוֹן šīfōn) – rye, oats, or spelt. Its Arabic cognate, šūfān (شُوفَان) refers to oats. Rabbi Nathan ben Abraham I translated shifon into Judeo-Arabic as sāʾfeh (סאפה), which Zohar Amar claimed is synonymous with an archaic Arabic word for oat, dowsir (دوسر). Rashi translated shifon as seigle (שיגלא), indicating rye (Secale cereale), which is not endemic to Israel, but was grown nearby. According to Dr Yehudah Felix, shifon is spelt.

The Talmud groups them into two varieties of wheat (hitah, kusmin) and three varieties of barley (seorah, shibolet shual, shifon).

Since European medieval times, Ashkenazi Orthodox Jewry accepts the five grains as wheat, barley, oats, rye and spelt.

Other than the traditional translation, some researchers today propose that only the grain species native to the Land of Israel can become chametz. This would rule out not only oats, but also rye (Secale) which grows in colder, wetter climates. They offer other translations to the 5 grains.

== Laws ==
A number of laws apply only to these five grains:

- Only bread made with these grains requires the blessing of hamotzi before eating, and birkat hamazon after eating.
- Only bread made from these grains is obligated in challah.
- Matzah can only be made from these grains, and conversely only these grains can become chametz and seor (sourdough).
- The prohibitions of eating and harvesting chadash only apply to these grains.

=== Oat matza ===
Oats are generally accepted in Ashkenazi Jewish tradition as one of the five species, but modern research suggests that what has been traditionally translated as "oats" is in fact a wild species of barley or other grains. This debate is practically significant because of the candidates for the five species, oats are the only one which is gluten-free. Although there have been no changes to normative Jewish law to reflect the debate, some rabbis take a stringent view and discourage the use of oat matzo to fulfill the biblical obligation of eating matzo at the Passover Seder. However, this discouragement does not apply for those with celiac disease or other medical conditions which preclude using one of the other grains; those who cannot, for whatever medical reason, eat any of the other 4 grains should use oat matzo at the seder, and eating oat matzo for those individuals fulfills the mitzvah. If, however, one cannot even eat oat matzo, he is exempt from the obligation.

== Additional species ==
According to Rabbi Johanan ben Nuri, rice and millet are also included among the "species of grain", and thus can become chametz and matza and are obligated in challah. This opinion was not accepted as halacha.

== See also ==
- Four species
- Seven species
