= Ephraim Abileah =

Russian-born Israeli composer

- Born: Leo Nieświżski; 1881; Russian Empire
- Died: 1953 (aged 71–72); Haifa, Israel

Ephraim Abileah (Hebrew: אפרים אביליה; 1881–1953) was a Russian-born Israeli composer. He is best known for composing the widely-used tune for the Ma Nishtana portion of the Passover Haggadah.

== Biography ==
Ephraim Abileah was born in the Russian Empire in 1881 as Leo Nieświżski, (Note: Also spelled Nesviski, Niswizski, and Niswiszki.) and was the son of a ḥazzan, Alexander Niswizski and Feiga (nee Solzman). He was among the founders of the Society for Jewish Folk Music in St Petersburg, and was one of three representatives who successfully presented the case for the Society's legalization in November 1908. He married Miriam Mosabowski in Warsaw, and the couple moved to Vienna, where he taught and composed music.

In 1922, motivated by Zionist convictions, he and his brother Arie left Russia for Mandatory Palestine, travelling via Egypt. The family settled in Haifa, where Abileah opened a music store. He died there in 1953.

== Compositions ==
Abileah's oratorio Ḥag ha-Ḥerut ('Festival of Freedom') recounts the Passover story. Although it was performed on stage just once, in Haifa in 1936, its setting of Mah Nishtanah circulated widely through oral transmission, printed songsters, and broadcasts on Israeli radio. The melody's authorship thus remained obscured for decades, and it is often attributed to an anonymous source or as a 'folk melody.' Before Abileah's composition, the Mah Nishtanah was typically not sung, but rather (in both Ashkenazic and Sephardic traditions) delivered in a chant.

Abileah also wrote a setting for the Sheva Brachot. Selections by Abileah were performed by the Jewish National Workers' Alliance choir in 1940.
