= Passover sacrifice =

Ancient Jewish practice

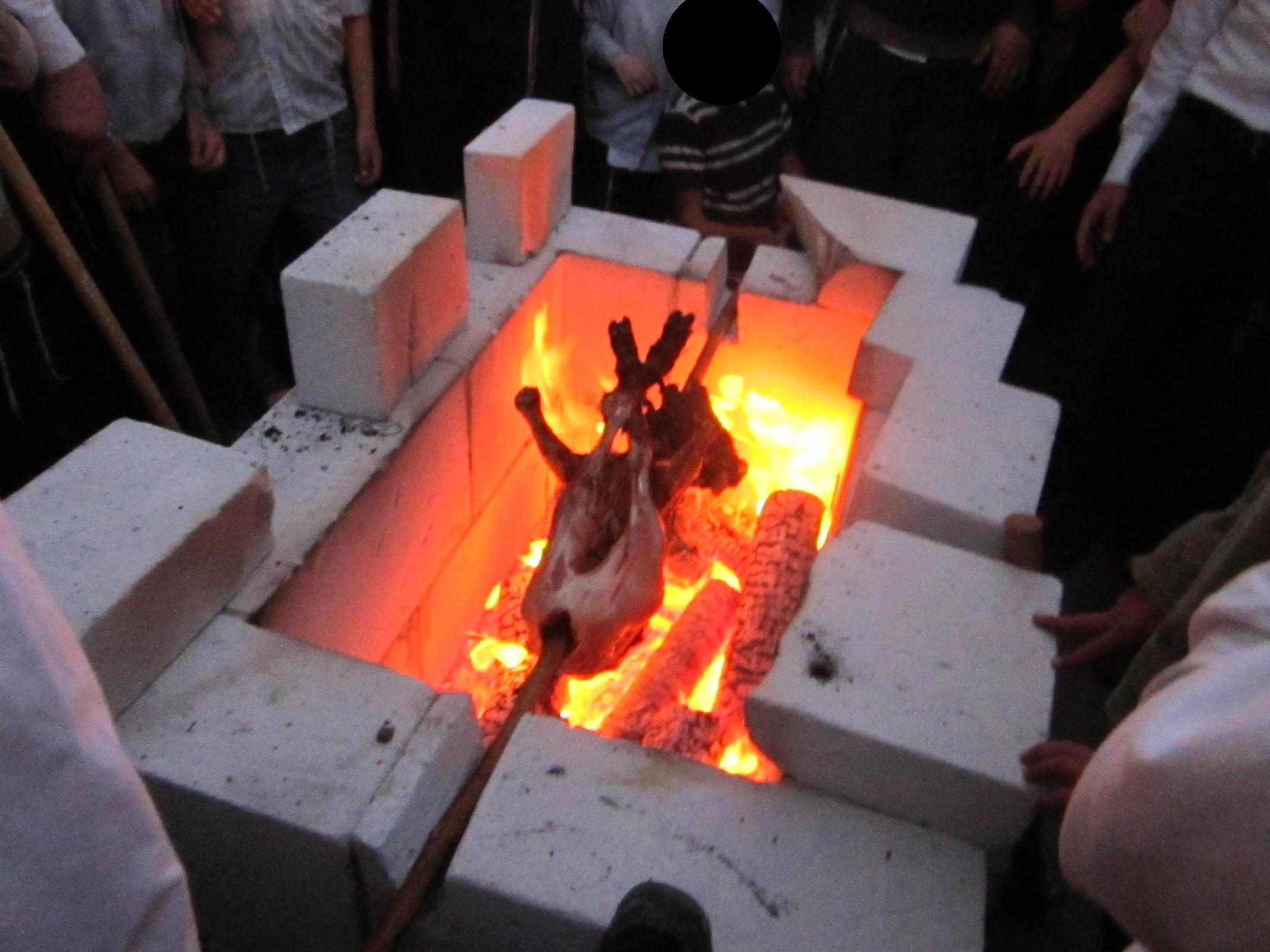
Practice of Passover sacrifice by Temple Mount activists in Jerusalem, 2012.

The Passover sacrifice (Hebrew: קרבן פסח, romanized: Qorban Pesaḥ), also known as the Paschal lamb or the Passover lamb, is the sacrifice that the Torah mandates the Israelites to ritually slaughter on the evening of Nisan 14, before Passover of Nisan 15, and eat lamb on the first night of the holiday with bitter herbs and matzo. According to the Torah, it was first offered on the night of the Exodus from Egypt. Although practiced by Jews in ancient times, the sacrifice is today not performed by the vast majority of Rabbinic Jews, but part of Beta Israel, Karaite and Samaritan observance.

== Biblical Observances ==
The Passover sacrifice is first mentioned in Chapter 12 of the book of Exodus. Each family was to take a one year old unblemished lamb, set it aside and guard it for four days. At twilight on the fourteenth day of that month, the Israelites were commanded to slaughter the lambs at twilight. The blood of this sacrifice was then placed on the door-posts of the homes in which it would be eaten. The lamb was roasted and eaten with unleavened bread and bitter herbs. (Exodus 12: 8). It had to be consumed that night with nothing left over. If there were any leftovers it was to be burned (Exodus 12:10). The text describes this ritual as a Passover offering to God (Exodus 12:11)

The blood on the doorposts served as a sign, so that when God passed through the land to strike the firstborn of Egypt, He would pass over the houses of the Israelites. (Exodus 12:13). The text further commands that his observance be kept as an annual statute for future generations (Exodus 12:24) It then states, "and when you enter the land that GOD will give you, as promised, you shall observe this rite" (Exodus 12:25). The text also connects the continued observance of the rite with the Israelites' future entry into the land. The next mention of the Passover sacrifice within the Five Books of Moses is in Numbers 9:1-3, where, in the second year after the Exodus, the Israelites are commanded to observe the sacrifice in the wilderness of Sinai according to all its statutes and ordinances. The Passover sacrifice is not mentioned again in the Torah narrative until the Israelites observe it after entering the land in Joshua 5, before the major conquest campaigns in Canaan begin.

The next biblical narratives describing the observance of the Passover sacrifice appear during the monarchic and post-exilic periods. According to 2 Chronicles 30, King Hezekiah organized a national Passover observance in Jerusalem during the First Temple period. A later Passover observance is described during the reign of King Josiah in 2 Kings 23. A parallel account in 2 Chronicles 35 includes additional descriptions relating to the slaughtering and preparation of the Passover offerings. Following the Babylonian exile and the rebuilding of the Temple, Ezra 6 describes another communal observance of the Passover sacrifice in Jerusalem.

== Biblical Legislation ==
=== The sacrificial animal ===
According to the Torah, the Passover sacrifice had to be an unblemished, one-year-old male "seh" (Exodus 12:5).

The Torah first refers to the sacrificial animal simply as seh. According to the Brown-Driver-Briggs Hebrew and English Lexicon, the term denotes either a sheep or a goat. Exodus 12:5 further specifies that the animal was to be an unblemished, one year old male and could be taken from either the sheep or the goats. Deuteronomy 16:2 later refers to the Passover sacrifice as being offered from the "flock and the herd" (tzone u'vakar), wording that has been the subject of later interpretation.

=== Time of Sacrifice ===
Exodus 12 establishes that the Passover sacrifice was to be observed in the first month of the year. The sacrificial animal was to be selected on the tenth day of the month and kept until the fourteenth day, when it was to be slaughtered at twilight. Deuteronomy 16:1 refers to the first month as hodesh ha-aviv("the month of Aviv"), stating that it was during this month that God brought the Israelites out of Egypt. Numbers 9 provides for a second observance of the Passover sacrifice in the second month for those who were unable to offer it at its appointed time because of ritual impurity or a distant journey

=== Place of the sacrifice ===
The original Passover sacrifice described in Exodus 12 was slaughtered and eaten within the Israelites' homes,, with its blood placed on the doorpost and lintel of the house in which it was eaten. Exodus 12:46 further states that the sacrifice was to be eaten in one house and that none of its meat was to be taken outside of the house. Numbers 9 records a later observance of the Passover sacrifice in the wilderness of Sinai, where the Israelites were commanded to observe it according to all its statutes and ordinances.

The Torah does not specify a particular location for the sacrifice in the account in Numbers 9. Deuteronomy 16:5-7 later states that the Passover sacrifice could not be offered within any of the Israelites' settlements, but only at the place that God would choose to establish his name.

== Rabbinical interpretation ==
Rabbinic literature distinguishes between the original Passover sacrifice described in Exodus and the Passover offerings observed in subsequent generations. The Mishnah (Tractate Pesachim 9:5) refers to the original sacrifice as the "Passover of Egypt" (Pesaḥ Miẓrayim in M.Pesach ix. 5), and contrasts it with the "Passover of Generations" (Pesah Dorot), identifying several legal differences between them.

According to Rashi (on Numbers 9:1), the Israelites offered the Passover sacrifice only once during their forty years of wandering in the wilderness, in the second year after the Exodus. The Passover sacrifice is next recorded after the Israelites crossed the Jordan and entered the land of Canaan (Joshua 5:10). Subsequent observances are recorded in the reigns of Hezekiah (2 Chronicles 30) and later Josiah (2 Kings 23). Rabbinic sources describe in detail the ritual procedures associated with the Passover sacrifice.

=== The sacrificial animal ===
Rabbinic sources later defined what qualified as a "seh" an elaborated on the procedures surrounding the offering and its slaughter. Each family or society offered one animal together, which did not require the semikah (laying on of hands), although it was obligatory to determine who were to take part in the sacrifice, so that it might take place with the proper intentions. Only those who were circumcised and clean before the Law might participate, and they were forbidden to have leavened food in their possession during the act of slaughtering the Passover lamb. The animal was slain on the eve of the Passover, on the afternoon of the 14th of Nisan, after the Tamid sacrifice had been slaughtered, i.e., at three o'clock, or, in case the eve of the Passover fell on Friday, at two.

The slaughtering took place in the courtyard of the Temple at Jerusalem. The slaughter could be performed by a layman, although the rituals dealing with the blood and fat had to be carried out by a priest. The blood had to be collected by a priest, and rows of priests with gold or silver cups in their hands stood in line from the Temple court to the altar, where the blood was sprinkled. These cups were rounded on the bottom so that they could not be set down, because the blood might thus coagulate. The priest who caught the blood as it dropped from the sacrificial animal then handed the cup to the priest next to him, receiving from him an empty one, and the full cup was passed along the line until it reached the last priest, who sprinkled its contents on the altar. The lamb was then hung upon special hooks or sticks and skinned; but if the eve of the Passover fell on a Sabbath, the skin was removed down to the breast only. The abdomen was then cut open, and the fatty portions intended for the altar were taken out, placed in a vessel, salted, and offered by the priest on the altar, while the remaining entrails likewise were taken out and cleansed.

While most services require a minyan of at least ten people, the Korban Pesach must be offered before a quorum of thirty—it must be performed in front of kahal adat yisrael, the assembly of the congregation of Israel; ten are needed for the assembly, ten for the congregation, and ten for Israel. According to some Talmudic authorities, such as Rav Kahana IV, women counted in the minyan for offering the passover sacrifice (B.Pesachim 79b).

=== Timing: Passover Eve on the Sabbath ===
Even if the eve of the Passover fell on a Sabbath, the Passover lamb was killed in the manner described above, the blood was sprinkled on the altar, the entrails removed and cleansed, and the fat offered on the altar; these four ceremonies in the case of the Passover lamb were alone exempt from the prohibition against working on the Sabbath. This regulation, that the Sabbath yielded the precedence to the Passover, was not definitely determined until the time of Hillel, who established it as a law and was in return elevated to the dignity of nasi by Judah ben Bathyra.(B.Pesachim 68a).

=== The three groups of lay people ===
The people taking part in the sacrifice were divided into three groups. The first of these filled the court of the Temple, so that the gates had to be closed, and while they were killing and offering their Passover lambs the Levites on the platform (dukhan) recited the Hallel (Psalms 113-118), accompanied by instruments of brass. If the Levites finished their recitation before the priests had completed the sacrifice, they repeated the Hallel, although it never happened that they had to repeat it twice. As soon as the first group had offered their sacrifice, the gates were opened to let them out, and their places were taken by the second and third groups successively.

All three groups offered their sacrifice in the manner described, while the Hallel was recited; but the third group was so small that it had always finished before the Levites reached Psalm 116. It was called the "group of the lazy" because it came last. Even if the majority of the people were ritually unclean on the eve of the Passover, the sacrifice was offered on the 14th of Nisan. Other sacrifices, on the contrary, called Hagigah, which were offered together with the Passover lamb, were omitted if the eve of the Passover fell on a Sabbath, if the sacrifice was offered in a state of uncleanness, or if the number of participants was so small that they could not consume all the meat. When the sacrifice was completed and the animal was ready for roasting, each one present carried his lamb home, except when the eve of the Passover fell on a Sabbath, in which case it might not be taken away.

=== The Home Ceremony ===
If the 14th of Nissan fell on the Sabbath, the first group stationed itself on the mount of the Temple in Jerusalem, the second group in the ḥel, the space between the Temple wall and the Temple hall, while the third group remained in the Temple court, thus awaiting the evening, when they took their lambs home and roasted them on a spit of pomegranate-wood, On all other days, they could do it before nightfall (and if the 15th of Nissan fell to be on the Sabbath they would have to). No bones might be broken either during the cooking or during the eating. The lamb was set on the table at the evening banquet (see Passover Seder), and was eaten by the assembled company after all had satisfied their appetites with the ḥagigah or other food. The sacrifice had to be consumed entirely that same evening, nothing being allowed to remain overnight. While eating it, the entire company of those who partook was obliged to remain together, and every participant had to take a piece of the lamb at least as large as an olive. Women and girls also might take part in the banquet and eat of the sacrifice. The following benediction was pronounced before eating the lamb: "Blessed be Thou, the Eternal, our God, the King of the world, who hast sanctified us by Thy commands, and hast ordained that we should eat the Passover." The Hallel was recited during the meal, and when the lamb had been eaten the meaning of the custom was explained, and the story of the Exodus was told.

The Passover sacrifice belongs to the category of zevachim that are eaten by the owner (similar to shelamim), thus forming one of the sacrifices in which the meal is the principal part and indicates the community between God and man. It is really a house or family sacrifice, and each household is regarded as constituting a small community in itself, not only because the lamb is eaten at home, but also because every member of the family is obliged to partake of the meal, although each male must be circumcised in order for it to be permissible for him to eat, and all must be ritually pure. The fact that the Passover lamb might be killed only at the central sanctuary of Jerusalem, on the other hand, implies that each household was but a member of the larger community; this is indicated also by the national character of the sacrifice, which kept alive in the memory of the nation the preservation and liberation of the entire people.

== Modern attempts to revive the sacrifice ==
In 2007, a group of rabbis including Adin Steinsalz and other members of the New Sanhedrin Council supported by the Temple Mount Faithful identified a Kohen who was a butcher, made plans for conducting a Passover sacrifice on the Temple Mount, and petitioned the Israeli High Court of Justice for permission. The Court sided with the government and rejected the request, holding that such an event would inflame religious tensions and would threaten security. The incident was a successor to a series of earlier attempts by various groups to perform such a sacrifice, either openly or by subterfuge.

In 2008, the animal rights group Let the Animals Live (Tnoo Lachayot Lichyot in Hebrew) founded in 1986, sued the Temple Institute, claiming its conduct of a practice Passover sacrifice demonstration would constitute animal cruelty. An Israeli court rejected the claim.

In 2016, Jewish activists pushing for a third temple in Jerusalem attempted to ascend the Temple Mount carrying baby goats intended to be used as Passover sacrifices on Friday afternoon, as they do every year. Jerusalem police detained ten suspects in the Old City for interrogation, and seized four sacrificial goat kids. Among those arrested were Kach activist Noam Federman, who attempts to make the sacrifice every year, and Rafael Morris, an activist in the Temple Mount Faithful movement.

The annual attempt to ascend the Temple Mount to perform the sacrifice in 2022 spawned widespread rumours of Jewish extremists supposedly planning to enter the Al-Aqsa Compound, where Jews are heavily restricted from entering and Jewish prayer is forbidden, inciting a riot which ultimately led to the 2022 Al-Aqsa Mosque clashes.

== In other traditions ==
In Christianity, the sacrifice of the Passover lamb is considered to be fulfilled by the crucifixion and death of Jesus, who is consequently also given the title Lamb of God.

== See also ==
- Korban
