= Chametz =

Leavened foods forbidden on Passover

Chametz (also chometz, ḥametz, ḥameṣ, ḥameç and other spellings transliterated from Hebrew: חָמֵץ / חמץ; IPA: [χaˈmets]) are foods with leavening agents that are forbidden to Jews on the holiday of Passover.

Chametz is a product that is both made from one of the five species of grain and has been combined with water and left to stand raw for longer than eighteen minutes (according to most opinions) and becomes leavened. This law appears several times in the Torah; according to halakha (Jewish law), Jews may not own, eat or benefit from chametz during Passover. The penalty for eating chametz on Passover is the divine punishment of kareth (cutting off).

== Etymology ==
The adjective chametz is derived from the common Semitic root Ḥ-M-Ṣ, relating to bread, leavening, and baking. The related noun chimutz is the process of leavening or fermenting. It is cognate to the Aramaic חמע, "to ferment, leaven" and the Arabic حَمْض ḥamḍ, "acid", حَمُضَ ḥamuḍa "to be sour", "to become acidic", "to acidify". This root relates to acidity and sourness in Hebrew as well, as the word chometz - חומץ - means vinegar, and the word chamootz - חמוץ - means sour.

== Torah-related sources ==
The Torah has several commandments governing chametz during Passover:

- The positive commandment to remove all chametz from one's home (Exodus 12:15).
- Not to possess chametz in one's domain. (Exodus 12:19, Deuteronomy 16:4).
- Not to eat chametz, or mixtures containing chametz (Exodus 13:3, Exodus 12:20, Deuteronomy 16:3).

The prohibitions take effect around late morning on the eve of Passover, or the 14th of the month of Nisan, in the Jewish calendar. Chametz is permitted again from nightfall after the final day of Passover, which is the 21st day of the month and the last of the seven days of Unleavened Bread (Exodus 13:6). Traditional Jewish homes spend the days leading up to Passover cleaning and removing all traces of chametz from the house.

== Description ==
Chametz is a product that is both made from one of five species of grain and has been combined with water and left to stand raw for longer than eighteen minutes (according to most opinions) and becomes leavened.

All fruits, grains, and grasses for example naturally adhere wild yeasts and other microorganisms. This is the basis of all historic fermentation processes in human culture that were utilized for the production of beer, wine, bread and silage, amongst others. Chametz from the five species is the result of a natural microbial enzymatic activity that is caused by exposing grain starch—which has not been sterilized, i.e. by baking—to water. This causes the dissolved starch to ferment and break down into sugars that then become nutrients to the naturally contained yeasts. A typical side effect of this biological leavening is the growth of the naturally adhering yeasts in the mixture, which produce gaseous carbon dioxide from glycolysis, which causes the fermented dough to rise and become increasingly acidic.

=== The five grains ===
According to the Talmud, chametz can only be present in the five species of grain. Other species are considered not to undergo "leavening" (chimutz), but rather "spoilage" (sirchon), and thus cannot become chametz.

At least four of the five grains contain high levels of gluten. The fifth grain (shibolet shual) is translated in Ashkenazi Jewish tradition as "oats" (which are low in gluten), but many modern scholars instead understand it to be a variety of barley (high in gluten). If the latter opinion is correct, then all five grains are high in gluten. That suggests that gluten is a necessary component of chametz, as it holds the dough together while rising, allowing the formation of a fluffy bread loaf.

=== Leavening ===
Leavening agents, such as yeast or baking soda, are not themselves chametz. Rather, it is the fermented grains. Thus yeast may be used in making wine. Similarly, baking soda may be used in Passover baked goods made with matzoh meal and in matzoh balls. Since the matzoh meal used in those foods is already baked, the grain will not ferment. Whether a chemical leavener such as baking soda may be used with flour in making egg matzoh is disputed among contemporary Sephardic authorities. In accordance with those who permit it, cookies made with Passover flour, wine and a chemical leavener (the absence of water would make them similar to egg matzoh under the chametz rules) are marketed in Israel under the name "wine cookies" to Sephardim and others who eat egg matzoh on Passover.

== Stringency ==
The Torah specifies the punishment of kareth, one of the highest levels of punishment in Jewish tradition, for eating chametz on Passover (Exodus 12:15). During Passover, eating chametz is prohibited no matter how small a proportion it is in a mixture although the usual rule is that if less than 1/60 of a mixture is not kosher, the mixture is permitted. If the dilution happened before Pesach, the usual 1/60 rule applies; Ashkenazi Jews apply this leniency only if the mixture is liquid.

Also, hana'ah (any benefit, such as selling) from some forms of non-kosher food is permitted, but no form of benefit may be derived from chametz during Passover. Mixtures consisting of less than 50% chametz that are not usually consumed by people (such as medicine or pet food—even if perfectly edible) may be owned and used on Passover but may not be eaten.

== Removal of chametz ==
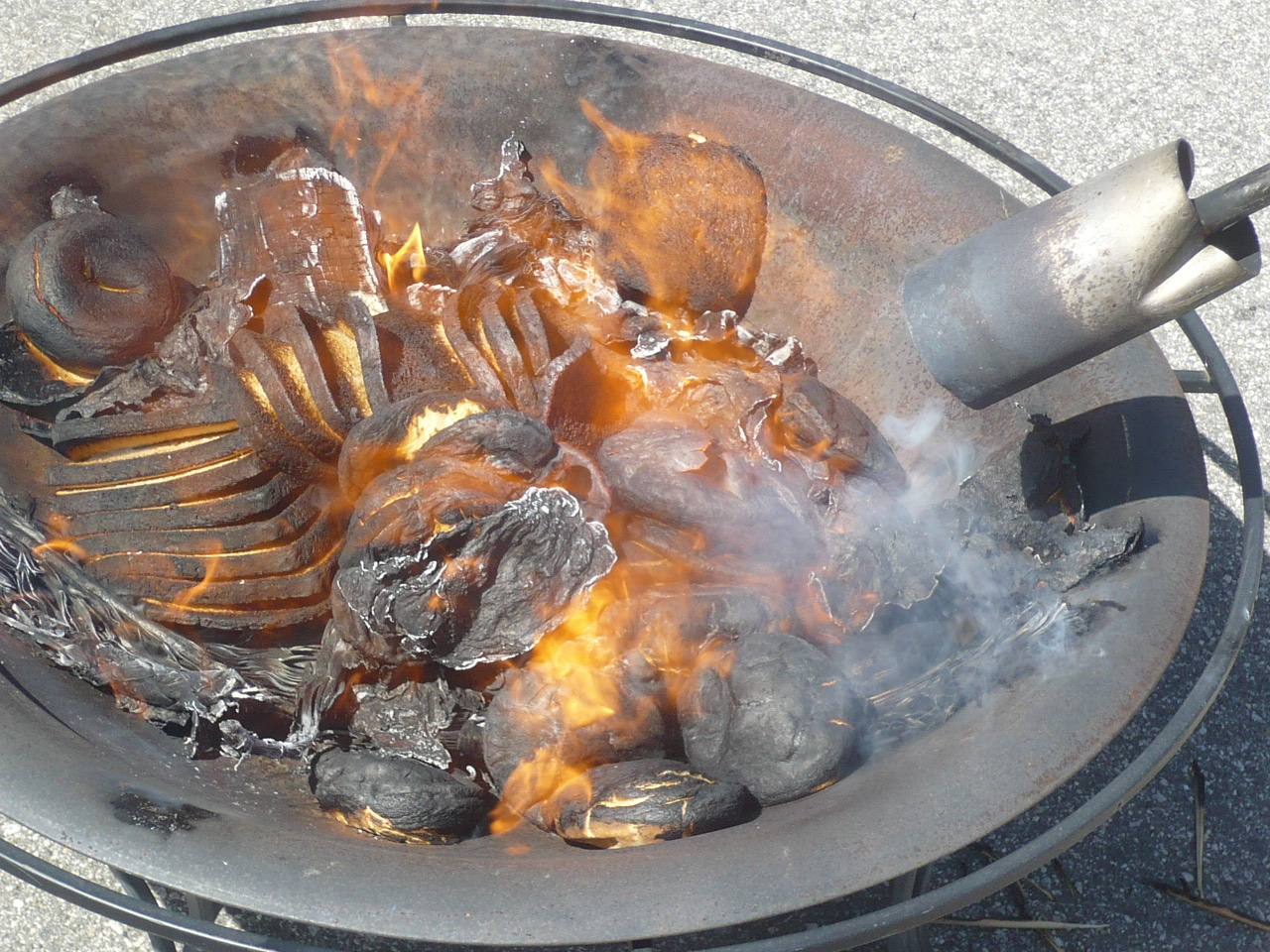
A small scale bi'ur chametz. Note the charred ashes of the lulav palm frond from Sukkot has been used for kindling to reuse a holy object to perform an additional mitzvah.

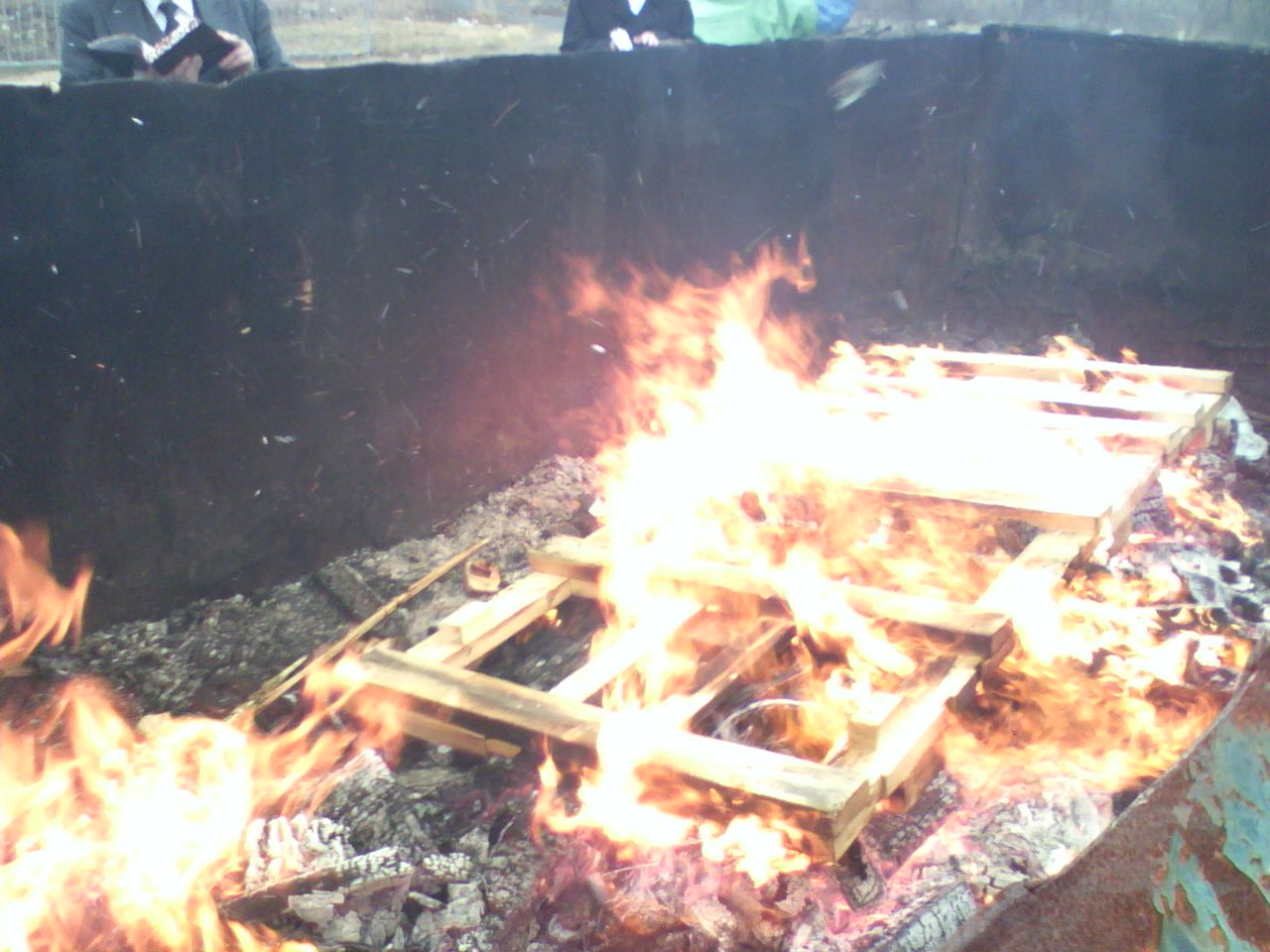
Bi'ur chametz (destroying chametz)

In addition to the Biblical prohibition of owning chametz, there is also a positive commandment to remove it from one's possession. There are three traditional methods of removing chametz:

- Bi'ur: (ביעור) destroying one's chametz. All appropriate methods of destruction, like burning, are included in this category. On the night preceding the 14th of Nisan, a formal bedikat chametz (search for chametz) is conducted by candlelight. The chametz found in this search is burned the next morning, in a formal bi'ur ceremony.
- Bittul (ביטול): nullifying one's chametz. On the night and again on the morning of the 14th of Nissan, at the formal bedikah and bi'ur respectively, the head of the household recites an Aramaic statement nullifying all chametz remaining in the family's possession. The statements conclude that the chametz "shall be nullified and considered ownerless as the dust of the earth." Bittul must be done before the prohibition of chametz takes effect; once five twelfths of the day have passed on Passover eve, bittul is no longer an effective means of removal, and any chametz that one discovers must be destroyed.
- Mechirah: (מכירה) selling one's chametz. Until five twelfths of the way through Passover Eve one may sell or give one's chametz to a non-Jew, and it is no longer one's responsibility. One who keeps the sold chametz in a household must seal it away so that it will not be visible during the holiday. After the holiday, the non-Jew generally sells the chametz back to the original owners via the agent; nevertheless, he is under no obligation to do so.

It is considered best to use both bi'ur and bittul to remove one's chametz even though either of these two methods is enough to fulfill one's biblical requirement to destroy it. Mechirah, which averts the prohibition of ownership, is an alternative to destruction.

=== Sale of chametz ===
In many Jewish communities, the rabbi signs a contract with each congregant, assigning the rabbi as an agent to sell their chametz. The practice is convenient for the congregation and ensures that the sale is binding by both Jewish and local law.

For chametz owned by the State of Israel, which includes its state companies, the prison service and the country's stock of emergency supplies, the Chief Rabbinate act as agent; during the 2000s, the Rabbinate sold its chametz to Jaaber Hussein, a hotel manager residing in Abu Ghosh, who puts down a deposit of 20,000 shekels for chametz worth an estimated $150 million.

In 1996, Chabad.org offered online authorization of a rabbi to act as an agent in the sale and transferred an Australian user's authorization to a local rabbi so that the repurchase would follow the local end of Passover.

== Chametz found during or after Pesach ==
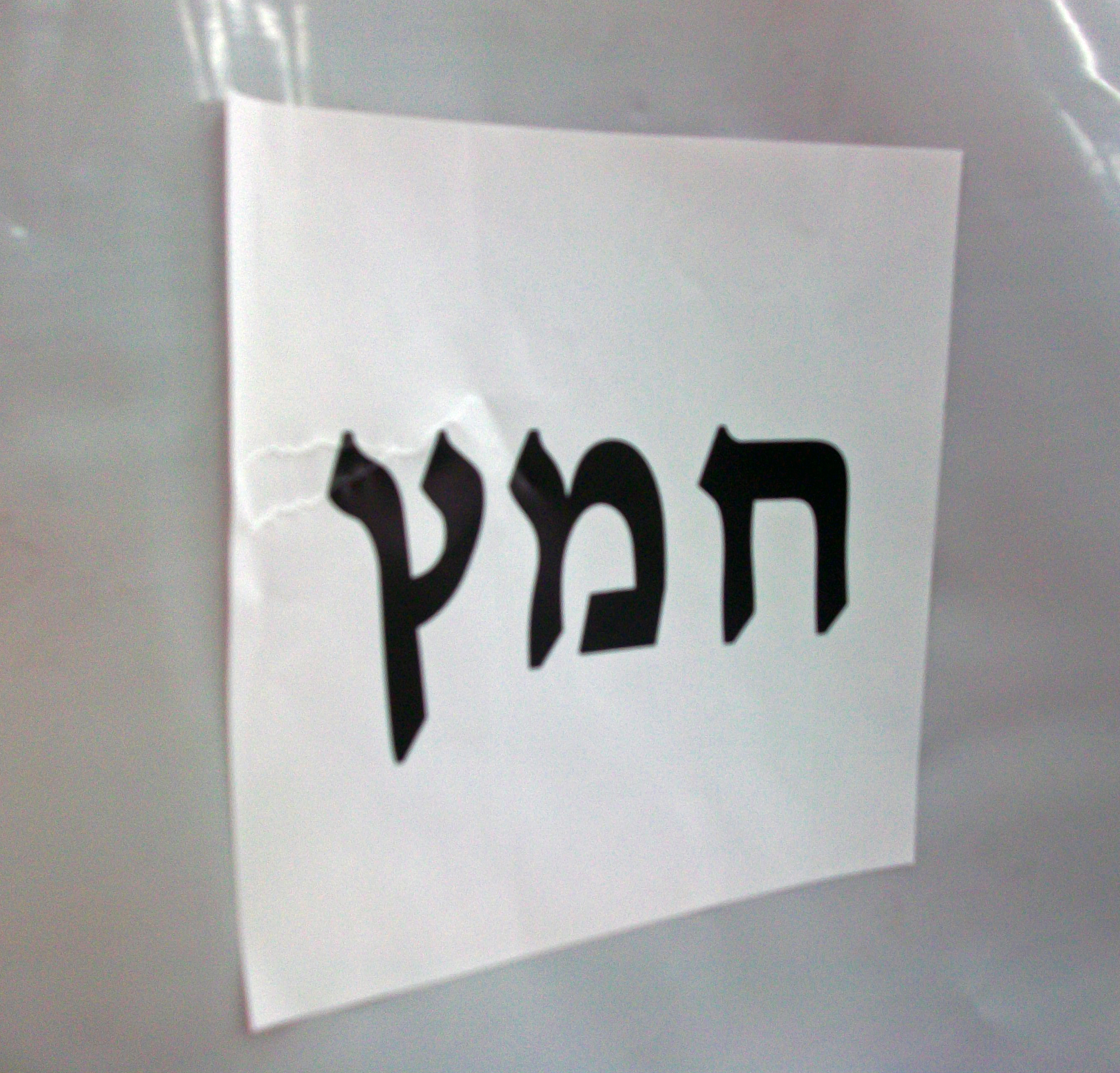
Chametz sign on blocked-off sections of a Jerusalem supermarket during Passover

According to halakha (Jewish law), if chametz is found during Shabbat or Yom Tov, it must be covered over until Chol HaMoed, when it can be burned. Chametz found during Chol HaMoed (except on Shabbat) should be burned immediately.

After the holiday, there is a special law known as chametz she'avar alav haPesach (chametz that was owned by a Jew during Pesach). Such chametz must be burned, since no benefit is allowed to be derived from it, not even by selling it to a non-Jew. Chametz she'avar alav haPesach may not be eaten by Jews after Pesach. If a store owned by a Jew is known not to have sold its chametz, a Jew may not buy any from that store until enough time has passed in which it can be assumed that the inventory has changed over since Pesach.

== Customs related to chametz ==
Because of the Torah's severity regarding the prohibition of chametz, many communities have adopted stringencies not biblically required as safeguards from inadvertent transgression.

=== Kitniyot ===
Among Ashkenazi Jews, the custom during Passover is to refrain not only from products of the five grains but also kitniyot (lit. small things), which refers to other grains or legumes. Traditions of what is considered kitniyot vary from community to community but generally include rice, corn, lentils, and beans. Many include peanuts as well.

The custom of kitniyot is observed by Ashkenazi Jews. Some Sephardi Jews from Spain and North Africa (for example, Moroccan Jews) have different restrictions, such as avoiding rice during Pesach. In recent years, there is some movement among Conservative as well as some Orthodox Ashkenazi Jews to cease to observe the tradition of kitniyot.

=== Egg matzo ===
Matzo is generally made from flour and water. If made from flour and a different liquid, such as fruit juice or eggs, it is not considered chametz. Ashkenazi custom is generally to avoid such products, in case some water was mixed into the liquid, which could cause the mixture to become chametz. This product is known as "egg matzo" or "enriched matzo".

=== Gebrochts ===
At Passover, some Hasidic Jews will not eat matzo that has become wet, including matzo balls and other matzo meal products although it cannot become chametz. Such products are called gebrochts (Yiddish: broken), referring to the broken or ground matzo used for baking or cooking. Instead of matzo meal, potato starch is used in cakes and other dishes. The Hebrew term for gebrochts is matzah sh'ruyah (Hebrew: מצה שרויה, soaked matzo), but outside Israel, the Yiddish name is usually the one that is used.

== See also ==
- Kashrut
